Notable American Women, 1607–1950: A Biographical Dictionary is a three-volume biographical dictionary published in 1971. Its origins lay in 1957 when Radcliffe College librarians, archivists, and professors began researching the need for a version of the Dictionary of American Biography dedicated solely to women.

Significance 
Notable American Women was the first major modern reference book of women's biographies, although the genre was common in earlier eras, such as the 1804 A Biographical Dictionary of the Celebrated Women Of Every Age and Country by Matilda Betham. It appeared when Women's studies in U.S. universities had created great interest in understanding women's past. Upon its publication it  was viewed by scholars as a magnificent contribution to understanding the role of women in U.S. history. 

Writing of the changes in perspective on biography inspired by Notable American Women, 1607–1950 Susan Ware observed, "1,359 entries showed the range and depth of women’s contributions to American life, a pointed correction to women’s near-total exclusion from existing biographical dictionaries at the time and a dramatic spur to further research."

Updates 
Notable American Women: The Modern Period : a Biographical Dictionary updated the set for subjects who died between 1951 and 1976. The work for that volume was a joint project of Radcliffe College and Harvard University Press funded by the National Endowment for the Humanities.

In 2004 volume 5 was issued: Notable American Women: A Biographical Dictionary Completing the Twentieth Century. The fifth volume in the series and was edited by historian Susan Ware who was assisted by Stacy Braukman. The women who were included had to have died prior to 2000. The volume differed from its predecessors because first ladies were not automatically included. Fame was not a factor, rather those chosen for inclusion had to have been influential or have contributed innovations or pioneering work in their area of expertise in their era.

Women included in Volumes 1-3

Abolitionists 

 Mary Ann Shadd Cary
 Elizabeth Buffum Chace
 Elizabeth Margaret Chandler
 Maria Weston Chapman
 Lydia Maria Francis Child
 Betsey Mix Cowles
 Ellen Craft
 Prudence Crandall
 Sarah Mapps Douglass Douglass
 Eliza Lee Cabot Follen
 Abigail Kelley Foster
 Frances Dana Barker Gage
 Abigail Hopper Gibbons
 Mary Grew
 Josephine Sophia White Griffing
 Angelina Emily Grimke
 Charlotte L. Forten Grimke
 Sarah Moore Grimke
 Laura Smith Haviland
 Sallie Holley
 Emily Howland
 Abigail Jemima Hutchinson
 Jane Elizabeth Hitchcock Jones
 Lucretia Coffin Mott
 Sarah Pugh
 Sarah Parker Remond
 Lucy Stone
 Sojourner Truth
 Harriet Tubman
 Frances Wright

Actresses and Theatre Managers 

 Viola Emily Allen
 Mary Anderson
 Julia Arthur
 Georgiana Emma Drew Barrymore
 Kate Josephine Bateman
 Blanche Lyon Bates
 Nora Bayes
 Jessie Bonstelle
 Agnes Booth
 Alice Brady
 Marie Cahill
 Caroline Louise Dudley Carter
 Georgia Eva Cayvan
 Caroline Chapman
 Ada Clare
 Marguerite Clark
 Kate Claxton
 Maggie Cline
 Rose Coghlan
 Jane Cowl
 Lotta Crabtree
 Laura Hope Crews
 Henrietta Foster Crosman
 Charlotte Saunders Cushman
 Fanny Lily Gypsy Davenport
 Julia Dean
 Elsie De Wolfe
 Frances Ann Denny Drake
 Marie Dressler
 Louisa Lane Drew
 Mary Ann Dyke Duff
 Jeanne Eagels
 Gertrude Elliott
 Maxine Elliott
 Effie Ellsler
 Rose Eytinge
 Clara Fisher
 Minnie Maddern Fiske
 Malvina Pray Florence
 Catherine Norton Sinclair Forrest
 Della Fox
 Pauline Frederick
 Anne Jane Hartley Gilbert
 Mary Louise Cecilia Guinan
 Mrs. Lewis Hallam
 Anna Held
 Chrystal Katharine Herne
 Matilda Agnes Heron
 Caroline Emily Fox Howard
 Cordelia Howard
 May Irwin
 Francesca Romana Magdalena Janauschek
 Bertha Kalich
 Laura Keene
 Frances Anne Kemble
 Cissie Loftus
 Olive Logan
 Pauline Lord
 Rose McClendon
 Julia Marlowe
 Adah Isaacs Menken
 Ann Brunton Merry
 Marilyn Miller
 Florence Mills
 Maggie Mitchell
 Helena Modjeska
 Lola Montez
 Helen Morgan
 Clara Morris
 Anna Cora Ogden Mowatt
 Alla Nazimova
 Antoinette Perry
 Adelaide Phillipps
 Elizabeth Arnold Hopkins Poe
 Ada Rehan
 Catherine Mary Reignolds
 Agnes Kelly Robertson
 May Robson
 Susanna Haswell Rowson
 Annie Russell
 Lillian Russell
 Mary G. Shaw
 Eva Tanguay
 Laurette Taylor
 Fay Templeton
 Blanche Oelrichs Thomas Barrymore Tweed
 Priscilla Cooper Tyler
 Mary Ann Farlow Vincent
 Helen Westley
 Blanche Galton Whiffen
 Matilda Charlotte Vining Wood

Anthropologists and Folklorists 

 Ruth Fulton Benedict
 Harriet Maxwell Converse
 Natalie Curtis
 Fannie Pearson Hardy Eckstorm
 Alice Cunningham Fletcher
 Lucy McKim Garrison
 Annie Aubertine Woodward Moore
 Zelia Maria Magdalena Nuttall
 Elsie Clews Parsons
 Erminnie Adele Platt Smith
 Matilda Coxe Evans Stevenson

Architects and Interior Decorators 

 Louise Blanchard Bethune
 Elsie De Wolfe
 Louise Caldwell Murdock
 Minerva Parker Nichols
 Edith Newbold Jones Wharton
 Candace Thurber Wheeler

Art Collectors and Patrons 

 Lizzie Plummer Bliss
 Claribel Cone
 Etta Cone
 Anna Charlotte Rice Cooke
 Anne Evans (arts patron)
 Juliana Rieser Force
 Isabella Stewart Gardner
 Belle da Costa Greene
 Louisine Waldron Elder Havemeyer
 Louise Caldwell Murdock
 Bertha Honore Palmer
 Abby Greene Aldrich Rockefeller
 Grace Rainey Rogers
 Gertrude Stein
 Mary Josephine Quinn Sullivan
 Gertrude Vanderbilt Whitney
 Catharine Lorillard Wolfe

Art Critics and Historians 

 Elisabeth Luther Cary
 Helen Gardner (art historian)
 Leila Mechlin
 Elizabeth Robins Pennell
 Mariana Alley Griswold Van Rensselaer
 Clara Erskine Clement Waters

Art Educators 

 Alice Van Vechten Brown
 Florence Nightingale Levy
 Mary Amelia Dana Hicks Prang
 Emily Sartain
 Eliza Allen Starr
 Irene Weir

Astronomers 

 Annie Jump Cannon
 Williamina Paton Stevens Fleming
 Henrietta Swan Leavitt
 Maria Mitchell
 Sarah Frances Whiting
 Mary Watson Whitney

Authors (by literary period)

1607-1820 

 Ann Eliza Bleecker
 Anne Bradstreet
 Elizabeth Graeme Ferguson
 Hannah Webster Foster
 Sarah Wentworth Apthorp Morton
 Judith Sargent Murray
 Susanna Haswell Rowson
 Tabitha Gilman Tenney
 Jane Colman Turell
 Mercy Otis Warren
 Phillis Wheatley
 Sally Sayward Barrell Keating Wood

1821-1860 

 Delia Salter Bacon
 Anne Charlotte Lynch Botta
 Maria Gowen Brooks
 Alice Cary
 Phoebe Cary
 Lydia Maria Francis Child
 Louise Amelia Knapp Smith Clapp
 Ada Clare
 Susan Augusta Fenimore Cooper
 Fanny Crosby
 Maria Susanna Cummins
 Lucretia Maria Davidson
 Margaret Miller Davidson
 Mary Henderson Eastman
 Elizabeth Fries Lummis Ellet
 Harriet Farley
 Eliza Ware Rotch Farrar
 Margaret Fuller
 Caroline Howard Gilman
 Sarah Josepha Buell Hale
 Frances Ellen Watkins Harper
 Emily Bradley Neal Haven
 Caroline Lee Whiting Hentz
 Ellen Sturgis Hooper
 Julia Ward Howe
 Emily Chubbuck Judson
 Juliette Augusta Magill Kinzie
 Caroline Matilda Stansbury Kirkland
 Eliza Leslie
 Octavia Celeste Walton Le Vert
 Sara Jane Clarke Lippincott
 Maria White Lowell
 Louisa Susannah Cheves McCord
 Maria Jane McIntosh
 Penina Moïse
 Anna Cora Ogden Mowatt
 Frances Sargent Locke Osgood
 Sara Payson Willis Parton
 Elizabeth Palmer Peabody
 Mary Hayden Green Pike
 Elizabeth Payson Prentiss
 Sophia Willard Dana Ripley
 Mary Anne Madden Sadlier
 Caroline Mehitable Fisher Sawyer
 Catharine Maria Sedgwick
 Lydia Howard Huntley Sigoumey
 Elizabeth Oakes Prince Smith
 Margaret Bayard Smith
 Emma Dorothy Eliza Nevitte Southworth
 Ann Sophia Stephens
 Harriet Beecher Stowe
 Caroline Sturgis Tappan
 Eliza L. Sproat Randolph Turner
 Louisa Caroline Huggins Tuthill
 Frances Auretta Fuller Victor
 Metta Victoria Fuller Victor
 Susan Bogert Warner
 Anna Bartlett Warner
 Frances Miriam Berry Whitcher
 Sarah Helen Power Whitman
 Augusta Jane Evans Wilson

1861-1900 

 Elizabeth Anne Chase Akers Allen
 Eliza Frances Andrews
 Alice Mabel Bacon
 Amelia Edith Huddleston Barr
 Sarah Tittle Barrett Bolton
 Alice Brown (writer) - 1856-1948
 Mary Edwards Bryan
 Mary Hartwell Catherwood
 Ednah Dow Littlehale Cheney
 Kate O'Flaherty Chopin
 Mary Bayard Devereux Clarke
 Rose Terry Cooke
 Ina Donna Coolbrith
 Fanny Crosby
 Mollie Evelyn Moore Davis
 Rebecca Blaine Harding Davis
 Margaret Deland
 Mary Ann Andrews Denison
 Abby Morton Diaz
 Emily Dickinson
 Mary Abigail Dodge
 Sarah Anne Ellis Dorsey
 Eliza Ann Dupuy
 Maud Howe Elliott
 Sarah Barnwell Elliott
 Annie Adams Fields
 Mary Anna Hallock Foote
 Mary Eleanor Wilkins Freeman
 Alice French
 Jeannette Leonard Gilder
 Anna Katharine Green
 Sarah Pratt McLean Greene
 Louise Imogen Guiney
 Lucretia Peabody Hale
 Susan Hale
 Phebe Ann Coffin Hanaford
 Frances Ellen Watkins Harper
 Constance Cary Harrison
 Marietta Holley
 Mary Jane Hawes Holmes
 Blanche Willis Howard
 Helen Maria Fiske Hunt Jackson
 Alice James
 Sarah Orne Jewett
 Grace Elizabeth King
 Lucy Larcom
 Emma Lazarus
 Laura Jean Libbey
 Josephine Woempner Clifford McCrackin
 Katharine Sherwood Bonner McDowell
 Julia Magruder
 Emily Clark Huntington Miller
 Annie Aubertine Woodward Moore
 Clara Sophia Jessup Moore
 Louise Chandler Moulton
 Mary Noailles Murfree
 Alice Dunbar Nelson
 Elizabeth Robins Pennell
 Sarah Morgan Bryan Piatt
 Elizabeth Payson Prentiss
 Margaret Junkin Preston
 Lizette Woodworth Reese
 Amélie Louise Rives
 Mary Anne Madden Sadlier
 Katharine Margaret Brownlee Sherwood
 Mary Elizabeth Wilson Sherwood
 Hannah Whitall Smith
 Emma Dorothy Eliza Nevitte Southworth
 Cornelia Ann Phillips Spencer
 Harriet Elizabeth Prescott Spofford
 Harriet Beecher Stowe
 Ruth McEnery Stuart
 Mary Virginia Hawes Terhune
 Celia Laighton Thaxter
 Edith Matilda Thomas
 Rose Alnora Hartwick Thorpe
 Frances Christine Fisher Tiernan
 Mabel Loomis Todd
 Metta Victoria Fuller Victor
 Elizabeth Stuart Phelps Ward
 Lilian Whiting
 Adeline Dutton Train Whitney
 Kate Douglas Smith Wiggin
 Ella Wheeler Wilcox
 Augusta Jane Evans Wilson
 Julia Amanda Sargent Wood
 Katharine Pearson Woods
 Sarah Chauncey Woolsey
 Constance Fenimore Woolson

1900-1950 

 Mary Raymond Shipman Andrews
 Mary Antin
 Gertrude Franklin Horn Atherton
 Mary Hunter Austin
 Katharine Lee Bates
 Anna Hempstead Branch
 Alice Van Vechten Brown
 Willa Sibert Cather
 Helen Archibald Clarke
 Florence Van Leer Earle Nicholson Coates
 Adelaide Crapsey
 Maud Howe Elliott
 Rachel Lyman Field
 Mary Parker Follett
 Zona Gale
 Katharine Elizabeth Fullerton Gerould
 Jeannette Leonard Gilder
 Ellen Anderson Gholson Glasgow
 Susan Keating Glaspell
 Corra May White Harris
 Grace Livingston Hill
 Mary Johnston
 Amy Lowell
 Jean Kenyon Mackenzie
 George Madden Martin
 Katherine Mayo
 Edna St. Vincent Millay
 Alice Duer Miller
 Margaret Munnerlyn Mitchell
 Harriet Monroe
 Alice Dunbar Nelson
 Frances Newman
 Rose Cecil O'Neill
 Josephine Preston Peabody
 Charlotte Endymion Porter
 Sara Agnes Rice Pryor
 Emily James Smith Putnam
 Myrtle Reed
 Lizette Woodworth Reese
 Agnes Repplier
 Alice Caldwell Hegan Rice
 Edith Rickert
 Lola Ridge
 Jessie Bell Rittenhouse
 Amelie Louise Rives
 Elizabeth Madox Roberts
 Constance Mayfield Rourke
 Jessie Ethel Sampter
 Anne Douglas Sedgwick
 Constance Lindsay Skinner
 Gertrude Stein
 Kate Stephens
 Gene Stratton-Porter
 Genevieve Taggard
 Ida Minerva Tarbell
 Sara Teasdale
 Edith Matilda Thomas
 Eunice Tietjens
 Kate Nichols Trask
 Blanche Oelrichs Thomas Barrymore Tweed
 Marie Louise Van Vorst
 Jean Webster
 Carolyn Wells
 Edith Newbold Jones Wharton
 Kate Douglas Smith Wiggin
 Nancy Mann Waddel Woodrow
 Mabel Osgood Wright
 Elinor Morton Hoyt Wylie

Biologists 

 Cornelia Maria Clapp
 Rosa Smith Eigenmann
 Ida Henrietta Hyde
 Mary J. Rathbun
 Nettie Maria Stevens

Botanists and Horticulturists 

 Eliza Frances Andrews
 Rachel Littler Bodley
 Mary Katharine Layne Curran Brandegee
 Elizabeth Gertrude Knight Britton
 Jane Colden
 Kate Furbish
 Louisa Boyd Yeomans King
 Martha Daniell Logan
 Ynes Enriquetta Julietta Mexia
 Almira Hart Lincoln Phelps
 Elizabeth Lucas Pinckney
 Elizabeth Waties Allston Pringle
 Kate Olivia Sessions
 Lydia White Shattuck
 Harriet Williams Russell Strong
 Anna Bartlett Warner

Chemists and Physicists 

 Rachel Littler Bodley
 Dorothy Anna Hahn
 Margaret Eliza Maltby
 Ellen Henrietta Swallow Richards
 Sarah Frances Whiting

Children's Authors 

 Louisa May Alcott
 Isabella Macdonald Alden
 Jane Andrews
 Margery Williams Bianco
 Abbie Farwell Brown
 Frances Eliza Hodgson Burnett
 Rebecca Sophia Clarke
 Mary Elizabeth Mapes Dodge
 Rachel Lyman Field
 Martha Finley
 Eliza Lee Cabot Follen
 Wanda Hazel Gág
 Lucretia Peabody Hale
 Annie Fellows Johnston
 Eliza Leslie
 Harriett Mulford Stone Lothrop
 Emily Clark Huntington Miller
 Olive Thome Miller
 Lucy Fitch Perkins
 Eleanor Hodgman Porter
 Elizabeth Payson Prentiss
 Alice Caldwell Hegan Rice
 Laura Elizabeth Howe Richards
 Eva March Tappan
 Eliza Orne White
 Kate Douglas Smith Wiggin
 Sarah Chauncey Woolsey

Circus Performers 

 Lillian Leitzel
 Annie Oakley
 Mercy Lavinia Warren Bump Stratton

Civil War Figures 

 Eliza Frances Andrews
 Clara Barton
 Mary Ann Ball Bickerdyke
 Belle Boyd
 Amy Morris Bradley
 Cloe Annette Buckel
 Anna Ella Carroll
 Mary Boykin Miller Chesnut
 Virginia Caroline Tunstall Clay-Clopton
 Ellen Collins (1828–1912)
 Elizabeth Leslie Rous Comstock
 Kate Cumming
 Varina Anne Howell Davis
 Anna Elizabeth Dickinson
 Dorothea Lynde Dix
 Sarah Emma Evelyn Edmonds
 Elida Barker Rumsey Fowle
 Barbara Hauer Frietschie
 Frances Dana Barker Gage
 Abigail Hopper Gibbons
 Mother Angela Gillespie
 Helen Louise Gilson
 Rose O'Neal Greenhow
 Charlotte L. Forten Grimke
 Cornelia Hancock
 Jane Currie Blaikie Hoge
 Juliet Ann Opie Hopkins
 Mary Ashton Rice Livermore
 Louisa Susannah Cheves McCord
 Abigail Williams May Abby W. May 1829-1888
 Sister Anthony O'Connell
 Emily Elizabeth Parsons
 Phoebe Yates Levy Pember
 Lucy Petway Holcombe Pickens
 Eliza Emily Chappell Porter
 Sarah Agnes Rice Pryor
 Mary Jane Safford
 Martha Schofield
 Louisa Lee Schuyler
 Mary Eugenia Jenkins Surratt
 Sally Louisa Tompkins
 Laura Matilda Towne
 Ella King Newsom Trader
 Harriet Tubman
 Adeline Blanchard Tyler
 Elizabeth L. Van Lew
 Mary Edwards Walker
 Annie Turner Wittenmyer
 Abby Howland Woolsey
 Georgeanna Woolsey
 Jane Stuart Woolsey
 Katharine Prescott Wormeley

Classicists 

 Edith Hayward Hall Dohan
 Harriet Ann Boyd Hawes
 Lida Shaw King
 Alice Elizabeth Kober
 Abby Leach
 Grace Harriet Macurdy
 Esther Boise Van Deman
 Helen Magill White

College Administrators 

 Elizabeth Cabot Cary Agassiz
 Mother Marie Joseph Butler
 Mabel Smith Douglass
 Harriet Wiseman Elliott
 Alice Seymour Browne Frame
 Alice Winfield Gordon Gulick
 Julia Henrietta Gulliver
 Caroline Hazard
 Grace Raymond Hebard
 Agnes Irwin
 Eliza Kellas
 Lida Shaw King
 Sister Julia McGroarty
 Elizabeth Storrs Billings Mead
 Susan Lincoln Tolman Mills
 Mary Kimball Morgan
 Mary Mortimer
 Eliza Maria Mosher
 Alice Elvira Freeman Palmer
 Mary Mills Patrick
 Ellen Fitz Pendleton
 Emily James Smith Putnam
 Aurelia Isabel Henry Reinhardt
 Ellen Clara Sabin
 Lucy Diggs Slowe
 Marion Talbot
 Martha Carey Thomas
 Ella Weed
 Mary Emma Woolley

Composers 

 Amy Marcy Cheney Beach
 Carrie Jacobs Bond

Dancers 

 Marie Bonfanti
 Suzanne Theodore Vaillande Douvillier
 Isadora Duncan
 Loie Fuller
 Mary Ann Lee
 Augusta Maywood
 Giuseppina Morlacchi
 Julia Anne Turnbull

Educational Reformers 

 Catharine Esther Beecher
 Joanna Graham Bethune
 Alice Josephine McLellan Birney
 Elizabeth Avery Colton
 Lucretia Crocker
 Grace Hoadley Dodge
 Lucy Louisa Coues Flower
 Zilpah Polly Grant
 Anna Hallowell
 Orie Latham Hatcher
 Mary Porter Tileston Hemenway
 Elisabeth Antoinette Irwin
 Mary Lyon
 Mary Cooke Branch Munford
 Celestia Susannah Parrish
 Pauline Agassiz Shaw
 Cornelia Ann Phillips Spencer
 Martha Carey Thomas
 Lila Hardaway Meade Valentine
 Emma Hart Willard
 Frances Wright
 Caroline Beaumont Zachry

Educators of the Handicapped 

 Sarah Fuller
 Emma Garrett
 Mary Smith Garrett
 Winifred Holt
 Anne Sullivan Macy
 Harriet Burbank Rogers
 Caroline Ardelia Yale
 Entrepreneurs
 Jane Aitken
 Mary Spratt Provoost Alexander
 Harriet Hubbard Ayer
 Elizabeth Eaton Boit
 Cornelia Smith Bradford
 Margaret Brent
 Ellen Louise Curtis Demorest
 Clara Driscoll
 Elizabeth Haddon Estaugh
 Mary Parker Follett
 Ann Smith Franklin
 Kate Gleason
 Mary Katherine Goddard
 Sarah Updike Goddard
 Anne Catherine Hoof Green
 Hetty Howland Robinson Green
 Margaret Gaffney Haughery
 Rose Markward Knox
 Margaret Getchell LaForge
 Rebecca Webb Pennock Lukens
 Nettie Fowler McCormick
 Elisabeth Marbury
 Lady Deborah Moody
 Eliza Jane Poitevent Holbrook Nicholson
 Anna Sartorius Uhl Ottendorfer
 Eleanor Medill Patterson
 Hannah Jane Patterson
 Mary Singleton Copley Pelham
 Hannah Callowhill Penn
 Elizabeth Peck Perkins
 Margaret Hardenbrook Philipse
 Elizabeth Lucas Pinckney
 Lydia Estes Pinkham
 Elizabeth Waties Allston Pringle
 Mary Foot Seymour
 Abigail Stoneman
 Ann Timothy
 Elizabeth Timothy
 Maria Van Cortlandt Van Rensselaer
 Maggie Lena Walker
 Sarah Breedlove Walker
 Charlotte Fowler Wells

Explorers and Travelers 

 Harriet Chalmers Adams
 Sarah Kemble Knight
 Ynes Enriquetta Julietta Mexia
 Annie Smith Peck
 Anne Newport Royall
 Sarah Eleanor Bayliss Royce
 Fanny Bullock Workman

Feminists 

 Mathilde Franziska Giesler Anneke
 Susan Brownell Anthony
 Alice Stone Blackwell
 Antoinette Louisa Brown Blackwell
 Amelia Jenks Bloomer
 Betsey Mix Cowles
 Hannah Mather Crocker
 Jane Cunningham Croly
 Hannah Maria Conant Tracy Cutler
 Caroline Wells Healey Dall
 Paulina Kellogg Wright Davis
 Abby Morton Diaz
 Rheta Childe Dorr
 Crystal Eastman
 Eliza Wood Burhans Farnham
 Mary Upton Ferrin
 Abigail Kelley Foster
 Margaret Fuller
 Frances Dana Barker Gage
 Helen Hamilton Gardener
 Charlotte Anna Perkins Stetson Gilman
 Emma Goldman
 Angelina Emily Grimke
 Sarah Moore Grimke
 Sarah Josepha Buell Hale
 Phebe Ann Coffin Hanaford
 Lydia Sayer Hasbrouck
 Harriot Kezia Hunt
 Abigail Jemima Hutchinson
 Jane Elizabeth Hitchcock Jones
 Kate Kennedy
 Anne Elizabeth McDowell
 Elizabeth Smith Miller
 Lucretia Coffin Mott
 Judith Sargent Murray
 Clarina Irene Howard Nichols
 Mary Sargeant Neal Gove Nichols
 Bethenia Angelina Owens-Adair
 Elizabeth Parsons Ware Packard
 Elsie Clews Parsons
 Ernestine Louise Siismondi Potowski Rose
 Rosika Schwimmer
 Abby Hadassah Smith
 Elizabeth Oakes Prince Smith
 Julia Evelina Smith
 Anna Garlin Spencer
 Elizabeth Cady Stanton
 Kate Stephens
 Lucy Stone
 Jane Grey Cannon Swisshelm
 Martha Carey Thomas
 Mary Edwards Walker
 Elizabeth Stuart Phelps Ward
 Hortense Sparks Malsch Ward
 Mercy Otis Warren
 Emmeline Blanche Woodward Wells
 Frances Elizabeth Caroline Willard
 Martha Coffin Pelham Wright
 Victoria Claflin Woodhull
 Abba Goold Woolson

Film Actresses and Directors 

 Alice Brady
 Marguerite Clark
 Laura Hope Crews
 Marie Dressler
 Pauline Frederick
 Mary Louise Cecilia Guinan
 Jean Harlow
 Florence Lawrence
 Carole Lombard
 Grace Moore
 Alia Nazimova
 Mabel Ethelreid Normand
 May Robson
 Florence E. Turner
 Lois Weber
 Pearl White

Geographer and Geologists 

 Florence Bascom
 Ellen Churchill Semple

Hawaiian Nobility 

 Bernice Pauahi Bishop
 Emma - Queen Emma of Hawaii
 Kaahumanu
 Kapiʻolani
 Liliuokalani

Health Reform Advocates 

 Sara Josephine Baker
 Emily Perkins Bissell
 Elizabeth Blackwell
 Madeline McDowell Breckinridge
 Caroline Julia Bartlett Crane
 Annie Sturges Daniel
 Katharine Bement Davis
 Paulina Kellogg Wright Davis
 Mary Coffin Ware Dennett
 Dorothea Lynde Dix
 Lydia Folger Fowler
 Love Rosa Hirschmann Gantt
 Harriot Kezia Hunt
 Jane Elizabeth Hitchcock Jones
 Alice Lakey
 Eliza Maria Mosher
 Mary Sargeant Neal Gove Nichols
 Elizabeth Parsons Ware Packard
 Eleanor Clarke Slagle
 Frances Stern
 Lila Hardaway Meade Valentine
 Charlotte Fowler Wells
 Rachelle Slobodinsky Yarros

Heroines 

 Priscilla Alden
 Martha Cannary Burk
 Margaret Cochran Corbin
 Martha Corey
 Virginia Dare
 Lydia Barrington Darragh
 Hannah Duston
 Agnes Surriage Frankland
 Barbara Hauer Frietschie
 Nancy Hart
 Ida Lewis
 Mary Ludwig Hays McCauley
 Jane McCrea
 Rebecca Nurse
 Pocahontas
 Betsy Ross
 Sacajawea
 Deborah Sampson
 Harriet Tubman
 Elizabeth Zane

Historians 

 Annie Heloise Abel
 Hannah Adams
 Mary Downing Sheldon Barnes
 Mary Louise Booth
 Frances Manwaring Caulkins
 Katharine Coman
 Alice Morse Earle
 Elizabeth Fries Lummis Ellet
 Helen Gardner
 Abby Maria Hemenway
 Kate Campbell Hurd-Mead
 Louise Phelps Kellogg
 Juliette Augusta Magill Kinzie
 Martha Joanna Reade Nash Lamb
 Deborah Norris Logan
 Nellie Neilson
 Zelia Maria Magdalena Nuttall
 Lucy Maynard Salmon
 Constance Lindsay Skinner
 Ida Minerva Tarbell
 Mariana Alley Griswold Van Rensselaer
 Frances Auretta Fuller Victor
 Mercy Otis Warren
 Clara Erskine Clement Waters
 Mary Wilhelmine Williams
 Helen Laura Sumner Woodbury

Historical Preservationists 

 Ann Pamela Cunningham
 Clara Driscoll
 Elizebeth Thomas Werlein

Home Economists 

 Helen Woodard Atwater
 Isabel Bevier
 Helen Stuart Campbell
 Juliet Corson
 Fannie Merritt Farmer
 Christine Terhune Herrick
 Emily Huntington
 Lizzie Black Kander
 Mary Johnson Bailey Lincoln
 Abby Lillian Marlatt
 Alice Peloubet Norton
 Maria Parloa
 Mary Randolph Randolph
 Ellen Henrietta Swallow Richards
 Sarah Tyson Heston Rorer
 Mary Davies Swartz Rose
 Frances Stern
 Marion Talbot
 Mary Virginia Hawes Terhune
 Martha Van Rensselaer
 Ruth Wheeler
 Mary Raphael Schenck Woolman

Illustrators 

 Francesca Alexander
 Anna Botsford Comstock
 Mary Anna Hallock Foote
 Wanda Hazel Gag
 Helen Elna Hokinson
 Neysa McMein
 Rose Cecil O'Neill
 May Wilson Preston
 Jessie Willcox Smith
 Alice Barber Stephens

Indian Captives 

 Hannah Duston
 Mary Jemison
 Fanny Wiggins Kelly
 Olive Ann Oatman
 Cynthia Ann Parker
 Mary White Rowlandson
 Frances Slocum

Indian Reform Advocates 

 Mary Lucinda Bonney
 Gertrude Simmons Bonnin
 Harriet Maxwell Converse
 Alice Cunningham Fletcher
 Anna Wilmarth Thompson Ickes
 Helen Maria Fiske Hunt Jackson
 Amelia Stone Quinton
 Alice Mary Robertson
 Elizabeth Elkins Sanders
 Susette La Flesche Tibbles
 Sarah Winnemucca

Indian Women 

 Gertrude Simmons Bonnin
 Mary Brant
 Alice Brown Davis
 Marie Dorion
 Milly Francis
 Roberta Campbell Lawson
 Madame Montour
 Mary Musgrove
 Susan La Flesche Picotte
 Pocahontas
 Sacajawea
 Catherine Tekakwitha
 Susette La Flesche Tibbles
 Nancy Ward
 Sarah Winnemucca

Inventors 

 Amanda Theodosia Jones
 Margaret E. Knight
 Sybilla Masters

Kindergartners 

 Eliza Ann Cooper Blaker
 Susan Elizabeth Blow
 Anna E. Bryan 1858-1901
 Sarah Brown Ingersoll Cooper
 Anna Hallowell
 Elizabeth Harrison
 Patty Smith Hill
 Maria Kraus-Boelte
 Annie Laws 1855-1927
 Mary Tyler Peabody Mann
 Emma Jacobina Christiana Marwedel
 Elizabeth Palmer Peabody
 Alice Harvey Whiting Putnam
 Margarethe Meyer Schurz
 Pauline Agassiz Shaw
 Lucy Wheelock
 Kate Douglas Smith Wiggin

Labor Leaders 

 Sarah G. Bagley
 Leonora Marie Kearney Barry
 Dorothy Jacobs Bellanca
 Jennie Collins
 Margaret Angela Haley
 Mary Harris Jones
 Kate Kennedy
 Agnes Nestor
 Leonora O'Reilly
 Mary Kenney O'Sullivan
 Elizabeth Flynn Rodgers
 Alzina Parsons Stevens
 Maud O'Farrell Swartz
 Augusta Lewis Troup

Labor Reformers 

 Gertrude Barnum
 Katherine Philips Edson
 Elizabeth Glendower Evans
 Mabel Edna Gillespie
 Ellen Martin Henrotin
 Alice Henry
 Anna Wilmarth Thompson Ickes
 Mary Morton Kimball Kehew
 Florence Kelley
 Maria Maud Leonard McCreery
 Mary Eliza McDowell
 Helen Marot
 Margaret Dreier Robins
 Daisy Florence Simms
 Hortense Sparks Malsch Ward
 Emma Carola Woerishoffer
 Maud Younger

Lawyers 

 Ada Matilda Cole Bittenbender
 Inez Milholland Boissevain
 Myra Colby Bradwell
 Phoebe Wilson Couzins
 Clara Shortridge Foltz
 Judith Ellen Horton Foster
 Emma Millinda Gillett
 Laura de Force Gordon
 Carrie Burnham Kilgore
 Belle Case La Follette
 Belva Ann Bennett McNall Lockwood
 Catharine Gouger Waugh McCulloch
 Arabella Mansfield
 Ellen Spencer Mussey
 Charlotte E. Ray
 Marilla Marks Young Ricker
 Marion Marsh Todd
 Catharine Van Valkenburg Waite
 Hortense Sparks Malsch Ward
 Sue Shelton White

Lecturers and Orators 

 Harriet Chalmers Adams
 Delia Salter Bacon
 Maria Louise Baldwin
 Leonora Marie Kearney Barry
 Hallie Quinn Brown
 Mary Fenn Davis
 Paulina Kellogg Wright Davis
 Anna Elizabeth Dickinson
 Annie LePorte Diggs
 Sarah Elizabeth Van De Vort Emery
 Eliza Wood Burhans Farnham
 Kate Field
 Mary Parker Follett
 Abigail Kelley Foster
 Margaret Fuller
 Frances Dana Barker Gage
 Charlotte Anna Perkins Stetson Gilman
 Emma Goldman
 Helen Mar Jackson Gougar
 Frances Ellen Watkins Harper
 Jane Elizabeth Hitchcock Jones
 Mary Elizabeth Clyens Lease
 Sara Jane Clarke Lippincott
 Mary Ashton Rice Livermore
 Olive Logan
 Anna Morgan
 Angelia Louise French Thurston Newman
 Annie Smith Peck
 Ernestine Louise Siismondi Potowski Rose
 Maria Louise Sanford
 Anna Howard Shaw
 Elizabeth Oakes Prince Smith
 Anna Carpenter Garlin Spencer
 Elizabeth Cady Stanton
 Eliza Allen Starr
 Lutie Eugenia Stearns
 Maria W. Miller Stewart
 Ida Minerva Tarbell
 Marion Marsh Todd
 Ida Bell Wells-Barnett
 Fannie Barrier Williams
 Frances Wright
 Ann Eliza Webb Young

Librarians 

 Mary Eileen Ahern
 Sarah Byrd Askew
 Sarah Comly Norris Bogle
 Mary Salome Cutler Fairchild
 Jennie Maas Flexner
 Belle da Costa Greene
 Mary Emogene Hazeltine
 Caroline Maria Hewins
 Mary Frances Isom
 Alice Bertha Kroeger
 Mary Wright Plummer
 Josephine Adams Rathbone
 Katharine Lucinda Sharp
 Lutie Eugenia Stearns
 Alice Sarah Tyler
 Beatrice Winser
 Mary Elizabeth Wood

Literary Scholars 

 Katharine Lee Bates
 Lucy Martin Donnelly
 Emily Clara Jordan Folger
 Myra Reynolds
 Edith Rickert
 Alice D. Snyder

Magazine Editors 

 Mary Louise Booth
 Mary Edwards Bryan
 Helen Archibald Clarke
 Mary Bayard Devereux Clarke
 Jane Cunningham Croly
 Mary Elizabeth Mapes Dodge
 Harriet Farley
 Jeannette Leonard Gilder
 Sarah Josepha Buell Hale
 Gertrude Battles Lane
 Lucy Larcom
 Eliza Leslie
 Miriam Florence Folline Leslie
 Harriet Monroe
 Charlotte Endymion Porter
 Margaret Elizabeth Munson Sangster
 Caroline Mehitable Fisher Sawyer
 Milicent Washburn Shinn
 Emmeline Blanche Woodward Wells
 Abigail Goodrich Whittelsey

Mathematicians 

 Charlotte Angas Scott

Ministers and Evangelists 

 Martha Gallison Moore Avery
 Hannah Jenkins Barnard
 Antoinette Louisa Brown Blackwell
 Olympia Brown
 Augusta Jane Chapin
 Elizabeth Leslie Rous Comstock
 Caroline Julia Bartlett Crane
 Mary Dyer
 Annis Bertha Ford Eastman
 Mary Fisher
 Eliza Paul Kirkbride Gurney
 Phebe Ann Coffin Hanaford
 Sophia Wigington Hume
 Rebecca Jones
 Sybil Jones
 Harriet Livermore
 Aimee Semple McPherson
 Lucretia Coffin Mott
 Phoebe Worrall Palmer
 Anna Howard Shaw
 Amanda Berry Smith
 Hannah Whitall Smith
 Caroline Augusta White Soule
 Anna Carpenter Garlin Spencer
 Mary Coffyn Starbuck
 Margaret Ann Newton Van Cott
 Amanda M. Way
 Jennie Fowler Willing

Missionaries 

 Eliza Jane Gillett Bridgman
 Saint Frances Xavier Cabrini
 Fanny Marion Jackson Coppin
 Mary Florence Denton
 Rose Philippine Duchesne
 Cynthia Farrar
 Fidelia Fiske
 Alice Seymour Browne Frame
 Mary Hannah Fulton
 Alice Winfield Gordon Gulick
 Mother Mary Bridget Hayden
 Laura Askew Haygood
 Frances Maria Mulligan Hill
 Sybil Jones 1808-1873
 Ann Hasseltine Judson
 Emily Chubbuck Judson
 Sarah Hall Boardman Judson
 Anna Sarah Kugler
 Susan Law McBeth
 Jean Kenyon Mackenzie
 Susan Lincoln Tolman Mills
 Sarah Luella Miner
 Lottie Digges Moon
 Harriet Atwood Newell
 Mary Mills Patrick
 Lucy Whitehead McGill Waterbury Peabody
 Mary Reed
 Ann Eliza Worcester Robertson
 Mother Mary Baptist Russell
 Eliza Hart Spalding
 Clara A. Swain
 Eliza Talcott
 Isabella Thoburn
 Lillias Stirling Horton Underwood
 Minnie Vautrin
 Narcissa Prentiss Whitman
 Mary Elizabeth Wood
 Laura Maria Sheldon Wright

Missionary Society Leaders 

 Belle Harris Bennett
 Mary Katharine Jones Bennett
 Alice Blanchard Merriam Coleman
 Sarah Platt Haines Doremus
 Martha Hillard MacLeish
 Lucy Jane Rider Meyer
 Helen Barrett Montgomery
 Angelia Louise French Thurston Newman
 Lucy Whitehead McGill Waterbury Peabody
 Jane Marie Bancroft Robinson
 Jennie Fowler Willing
 Annie Turner Wittenmyer

Mormon Women 

 Eliza Roxey Snow Smith
 Emma Hale Smith
 Emmeline Blanche Woodward Wells
 Ann Eliza Webb Young

Music Educators and Patrons 

 Emma Azalia Smith Hackley
 Adella Prentiss Hughes
 Clara Damrosch Mannes
 Georgia Lydia Stevens
 Ellen Battell Stoeckel
 Maria Longworth Nichols Storer
 Jeannette Meyers Thurber

Naturalists 

 Florence Augusta Merriam Bailey
 Anna Botsford Comstock
 Neltje Blanchan De Graff Doubleday
 Fannie Pearson Hardy Eckstorm
 Maria Martin
 Olive Thorne Miller
 Lydia White Shattuck
 Mary Morris Vaux Walcott
 Mabel Osgood Wright

Negro Women 

 Maria Louise Baldwin
 Janie Porter Barrett
 Eva del Vakia Bowles
 Hallie Quinn Brown
 Mary Ann Shadd Cary
 Fanny Marion Jackson Coppin
 Ellen Craft
 Sarah Mapps Douglass Douglass
 Sarah J. Smith Thompson Garnet
 Elizabeth Taylor Greenfield
 Charlotte L. Forten Grimke
 Emma Azalia Smith Hackley
 Frances Ellen Watkins Harper
 Addie D. Waites Hunton
 Matilda Sissieretta Joyner Jones
 Elizabeth Keckley
 Lucy Craft Laney
 Edmonia Lewis
 Rose McClendon
 Mary Eliza Mahoney
 Victoria Earle Matthews
 Florence Mills
 Lucy Ella Moten
 Alice Dunbar Nelson
 Mary Ellen Pleasant
 Charlotte E. Ray
 Gertrude Pridgett Rainey
 Sarah Parker Remond
 Josephine St. Pierre Ruffin
 Lucy Diggs Slowe
 Amanda Berry Smith
 Bessie Smith
 Maria W. Miller Stewart
 Adah B. Samuels Thoms
 Sojourner Truth
 Harriet Tubman
 Maggie Lena Walker
 Sarah Breedlove Walker
 Ida Bell Wells-Barnett
 Phillis Wheatley
 Fannie Barrier Williams

Newspaperwomen 

 Elizabeth Anne Chase Akers Allen
 Mary E. Clemmer Ames
 Harriet Hubbard Ayer
 Winifred Sweet Black
 Cornelia Smith Bradford
 Emily Pomona Edson Briggs
 Elisabeth Luther Cary
 Mary Ann Shadd Cary
 Jane Cunningham Croly
 Rheta Childe Dorr
 Rebecca Ann Latimer Felton
 Kate Field
 Ann Smith Franklin

Performing Musicians 

 Jeannette Leonard Gilder
 Mary Katherine Goddard
 Sarah Updike Goddard
 Nixola Greeley-Smith
 Anne Catherine Hoof Green
 Margherita Arlina Hamm
 Ida A. Husted Harper
 Alice Henry
 Elizabeth Garver Jordan
 Florence Finch Kelly
 Amy Leslie
 Annie Louise Brown Leslie
 Sophie Irene Simon Loeb
 Anne Elizabeth McDowell
 Marie Manning
 Leila Mechlin
 Marie Mattingly Meloney
 Eliza Jane Poitevent Holbrook Nicholson
 Anna Sartorius Uhl Ottendorfer
 Clementina Rind
 Anne Newport Royall
 Ellen Browning Scripps
 Elizabeth Cochrane Seaman
 Katharine Margaret Brownlee Sherwood
 Agnes Smedley
 Jane Grey Cannon Swisshelm
 Ann Timothy
 Elizabeth Timothy
 Cornelia Wells Walter
 Ida Bell Wells-Barnett
 Julia Amanda Sargent Wood

Nurses 

 Ella Phillips Crandall
 Jane Arminda Delano
 Sister Mary Joseph Dempsey
 Sister Elizabeth Fedde
 Mary Eliza Mahoney
 Anna Caroline Maxwell
 Mary Adelaide Nutting
 Sophia French Palmer
 Louise Mathilde Powell
 Linda Richards
 Isabel Adams Hampton Robb
 Julia Catherine Stimson
 Adah B. Samuels Thoms
 Adeline Blanchard Tyler
 Lillian D. Wald

Painters 

 Cecilia Beaux
 Fidelia Bridges
 Jennie Augusta Brownscombe
 Mary Cassatt
 Lucia Fairchild Fuller
 Anne Wilson Goldthwaite
 Sarah Goodridge
 Eliza Pratt Greatorex
 Susan Hale
 Ann Hall
 Anna Eliza Hardy
 Sophia Amelia Peabody Hawthorne
 Henrietta Johnston
 Helen Mary Knowlton
 Maria Martin
 Anna Claypoole Peale
 Margaretta Angelica Peale
 Sarah Miriam Peale
 Eunice Griswold Pinney
 Ellen Gertrude Emmet Rand
 Emily Sartain
 Lilly Martin Spencer
 Florine Stettheimer
 Mary Morris Vaux Walcott
 Irene Weir

Peace Advocates 

 Jane Addams
 Fannie Fern Phillips Andrews
 Hannah Clark Johnston Bailey
 Carrie Clinton Lane Chapman Catt
 Mary Coffin Ware Dennett
 Helena Stuart Dudley
 Crystal Eastman
 Jessie Annette Jack Hooper
 Belva Ann Bennett McNall Lockwood
 Lucia True Ames Mead
 Caroline Love Goodwin O'Day
 Rosika Schwimmer
 Fanny Garrison Villard
 Anna White
 Mary Emma Woolley

Performing Musicians 

 Emma Abbott
 Anna Riviere Bishop
 Sophie Braslau
 Teresa Carreño
 Annie Louise Cary 1841-1921
 Eleonora de Cisneros
 Zelie de Lussan
 Amy Fay
 Della May Fox
 Elizabeth Taylor Greenfield
 Alma Gluck
 Emma Azalia Smith Hackley
 Minnie Hauk
 Louise Dilworth Beatty Homer
 Helen Hopekirk
 Matilda Sissieretta Joyner Jones
 Emma Johanna Antonia Juch
 Clara Louise Kellogg
 Selma Kronold
 Clara Damrosch Mannes
 Grace Moore
 Helen Morgan
 Emma Nevada
 Alice Nielsen
 Lillian Nordica
 Adelina Patti
 Adelaide Phillipps
 Maud Powell
 Gertrude Pridgett Rainey
 Corinne Rider-Kelsey
 Julie Rive-King
 Olga Samaroff
 Sibyl Swift Sanderson
 Ernestine Schumann-Heink
 Marcella Sembrich
 Bessie Smith
 Emma Cecilia Thursby
 Camilla Urso
 Marie Van Zandt
 Edyth Walker
 Ellen Beach Yaw
 Fannie Bloomfield Zeisler

Philanthropists 

 Elizabeth Milbank Anderson
 Bernice Pauahi Bishop
 Lizzie Plummer Bliss
 Ellen Warren Scripps Booth
 Catherine Wolfe Bruce
 Mary Gwendolin Caldwell
 Louise Whitfield Carnegie
 Ednah Dow Littlehale Cheney
 Anna Virginia Russell Cole
 Ellen Collins 1828-1912
 Claribel Cone
 Etta Cone
 Grace Hoadley Dodge
 Mary Anna Palmer Draper
 Clara Driscoll
 Dorothy Leib Harrison Wood Eustis
 Carrie Bamberger Frank Fuld
 Mary Elizabeth Garrett
 Catherine Littlefield Greene
 Anna M. Richardson Harkness
 Mary Emma Stillman Harkness
 Mary Williamson Averell Harriman
 Margaret Gaffney Haughery
 Louisine Waldron Elder Havemeyer
 Phoebe Apperson Hearst
 Mary Porter Tileston Hemenway
 Winifred Holt
 Emily Howland
 Anna Thomas Jeanes
 Helen Hartley Jenkins
 Kate Macy Ladd
 Irene Lewisohn
 Edith Rockefeller McCormick
 Nettie Fowler McCormick
 Josephine Louise Le Monnier Newcomb
 Anna Sartorius Uhl Ottendorfer
 Lizzie Pitts Merrill Palmer
 Elizabeth Peck Perkins
 Sarah Anne Worthington King Peter
 Caroline Amanda Sherfey Rand
 Elisabeth Mills Reid
 Abby Greene Aldrich Rockefeller
 Grace Rainey Rogers
 Margaret Olivia Slocum Sage
 Ellen Browning Scripps
 Pauline Agassiz Shaw
 Sophia Smith
 Ellin Leslie Prince Lowery Speyer
 Jane Eliza Lathrop Stanford
 Ellen Battell Stoeckel
 Caroline Phelps Stokes
 Olivia Egleston Phelps Stokes
 Elizabeth Rowell Thompson
 Jeannette Meyers Thurber
 Kate Nichols Trask
 Fanny Garrison Villard
 Sarah Breedlove Walker
 Emma Carola Woerishoffer
 Catharine Lorillard Wolfe

Philosophers 

 Mary Whiton Calkins
 Julia Henrietta Gulliver
 Christine Ladd-Franklin

Photographer 

 Gertrude Stanton Käsebier

Physicians 

 Sara Josephine Baker
 Katharine Isabel Hayes Chapin Barrows
 Alice Bennett
 Elizabeth Blackwell
 Emily Blackwell
 Rachel Littler Bodley
 Anna Elizabeth Broomall
 Charlotte Amanda Blake Brown
 Ruth Jane Mack Brunswick
 Cloe Annette Buckel
 Emeline Horton Cleveland
 Claribel Cone
 Hannah Maria Conant Tracy Cutler
 Annie Sturges Daniel
 Lydia Maria Adams De Witt
 Susan Dimock
 Sarah Read Adamson Dolley
 Anne Walter Fearn
 Lydia Folger Fowler
 Mary Hannah Fulton
 Love Rosa Hirschmann Gantt
 Harriot Kezia Hunt
 Kate Campbell Hurd-Mead
 Elizabeth Hurdon
 Mary Corinna Putnam Jacobi
 Anna Sarah Kugler
 Hannah E. Myers Longshore
 Clemence Sophia Harned Lozier
 Anita Newcomb McGee
 Clara Marshall
 Sara Tew Mayo
 Marie Josepha Mergler
 Eliza Maria Mosher
 Bethenia Angelina Owens-Adair
 Susan La Flesche Picotte
 Ann Preston
 Sarah Parker Remond
 Martha George Rogers Ripley
 Jane Elizabeth Robbins
 Mary Jane Safford
 Lucy Ellen Sewall
 Mary Sherwood
 Sarah Ann Hackett Stevenson
 Clara A. Swain
 Lucy Beaman Hobbs Taylor
 Mary Frame Myers Thomas
 Mary Harris Thompson
 Martha Tracy
 Lillias Stirling Horton Underwood
 Lilian Welsh
 Martha Wollstein
 Rachelle Slobodinsky Yarros
 Marie Elizabeth Zakrzewska

Political Figures

Advisers and Appointees 

 Grace Abbott
 Lady Frances Berkeley
 Harriet Morehead Berry
 Margaret Brent
 Kate Richards O'Hare Cunningham
 Katherine Philips Edson
 Harriet Wiseman Elliott
 Rebecca Ann Latimer Felton
 Jessie Ann Benton Fremont
 Helen Hamilton Gardener
 Belle Case La Follette
 Julia Clifford Lathrop
 Mary Simmerson Cunningham Logan
 Belle Lindner Israels Moskowitz
 Hannah Jane Patterson
 Mary Harriman Rumsey
 Anna Howard Shaw
 Sue Shelton White

Congresswomen and Senators 

 Hattie Ophelia Wyatt Caraway
 Rebecca Ann Latimer Felton
 Winnifred Sprague Mason Huck
 Florence Prag Kahn
 Katherine Gudger Langley
 Caroline Love Goodwin O'Day
 Alice Mary Robertson
 Ruth Hanna McCormick Simms

Other Elected Officials 

 Kate Barnard
 Anna Wilmarth Thompson Ickes
 Belle Kearney
 Hannah Jensen Kempfer
 Mary Olszewski Kryszak
 Bertha Ethel Knight Landes

Party Workers 

 Hallie Quinn Brown
 Kate Richards O'Hare Cunningham
 Annie LePorte Diggs
 Clara Driscoll
 Katherine Philips Edson
 Sarah Elizabeth Van De Vort Emery
 Clara Shortridge Foltz
 Judith Ellen Horton Foster
 Mary Garrett Hay
 Mary Elizabeth Clyens Lease
 Alice Dunbar Nelson
 Marion Marsh Todd
 Harriet Taylor Upton
 Hortense Sparks Malsch Ward
 Sue Shelton White

Propagandists 

 Anna Ella Carroll
 Jane Maria Eliza McManus Storms Cazneau
 Sarah Elizabeth Van De Vort Emery
 Jessie Ann Benton Fremont
 Rose O'Neal Greenhow
 Mary Phelps Austin Holley
 Marion Marsh Todd

Printmakers 

 Anna Botsford Comstock
 Mary Nimmo Moran
 Frances Flora Bond Palmer
 Emily Sartain

Prison Reformers 

 Katharine Isabel Hayes Chapin Barrows
 Maud Ballington Booth
 Elizabeth Leslie Rous Comstock
 Kate Richards O'Hare Cunningham
 Katharine Bement Davis
 Martha Platt Falconer
 Eliza Wood Burhans Farnham
 Rebecca Ann Latimer Felton
 Clara Shortridge Foltz
 Abigail Hopper Gibbons
 Linda Gilbert
 Emma Amelia Hall
 Jessie Donaldson Hodder
 Ellen Cheney Johnson
 Julia Strudwick Tutwiler
 Caroline Bayard Wittpen

Psychologists 

 Mary Whiton Calkins
 June Etta Downey
 Mary Parker Follett
 Leta Anna Stetter Hollingworth
 Christine Ladd-Franklin
 Lillien Jane Martin
 Milicent Washburn Shinn
 Margaret Floy Washburn
 Helen Bradford Thompson Woolley
 Caroline Beaumont Zachry

Religious Educators 

 Joanna Graham Bethune
 Harriet E. Bishop
 Josephine Van Dyke Brownson
 Mother Marie Joseph Butler
 Adelaide Teague Case
 Cornelia Augusta Connelly
 Mother Angela Gillespie
 Rebecca Gratz
 Mother Mary Aloysia Hardey
 Sister Julia McGroarty
 Mary Kimball Morgan
 Ellen Albertina Polyblank
 Mary Rhodes
 Elizabeth Ann Rogers
 Elizabeth Ann Bayley Seton
 Georgia Lydia Stevens
 Henrietta Benigna Justine Zinzendorf von Watteville

Religious Founders and Leaders 

 Anne Ayres
 Helena Petrovna Hahn Blavatsky
 Evangeline Cory Booth
 Maud Ballington Booth
 Saint Frances Xavier Cabrini
 Harriet Starr Cannon
 Cornelia Augusta Connelly
 Mary Fenn Davis
 Frances Dickinson
 Rose Philippine Duchesne
 Mary Baker Eddy
 Myrtle Page Fillmore
 Ann Leah, Margaret, and Catherine Fox - Fox sisters
 Ursula Newell Gestefeld
 Mother Angela Gillespie
 Mother Mary Aloysia Hardey
 Barbara Ruckle Heck
 Barbara Heinemann
 Emma Curtis Hopkins
 Anne Hutchinson
 Mother Mary Alphonsa Lathrop
 Ann Lee
 Aimee Semple McPherson
 Ann Teresa Matthews
 Mary Rhodes
 Mother Benedicta Riepp
 Mother Mary Baptist Russell
 Elizabeth Ann Bayley Seton
 Catherine Spalding
 Augusta Emma Simmons Stetson
 Henrietta Szold
 Katherine Augusta Westcott Tingley
 Alma Bridwell White
 Anna White
 Ellen Gould Harmon White
 Jemima Wilkinson
 Lucy Wright

See also Ministers and Evangelists; Missionaries

School Founders and Administrators 

 Jane Andrews
 Mathilde Franziska Giesler Anneke
 Mary Atkins
 Maria Louise Baldwin
 Janie Porter Barrett
 Catharine Esther Beecher
 Martha McChesney Berry
 Anna Elvira Bliss
 Mary Lucinda Bonney
 Anna Callender Brackett
 Amy Morris Bradley
 Eliza Jane Gillet Bridgman
 Mother Marie Joseph Butler
 Fanny Marion Jackson Coppin
 Betsey Mix Cowles
 Prudence Crandall
 Sarah Ann Dickey
 Susan Almira Miller Dorsey
 Rose Philippine Duchesne
 Abbie Park Ferguson
 Mother Angela Gillespie
 Zilpah Polly Grant
 Emily Griffith
 Alice Winfield Gordon Gulick
 Cornelia Hancock
 Mother Mary Aloysia Hardey
 Mother Mary Bridget Hayden
 Laura Askew Haygood
 Frances Maria Mulligan Hill
 Sallie Holley
 Emily Howland
 Agnes Irwin
 Elisabeth Antoinette Irwin
 Eliza Kellas
 Lucy Craft Laney
 Mary Lyon
 Martha Hillard MacLeish
 Susan Lincoln Tolman Mills
 Myrtilla Miner
 Sarah Luella Miner
 Anna Morgan
 Mary Kimball Morgan
 Mary Mortimer
 Lucy Ella Moten
 Sophia B. Packard
 Celestia Susannah Parrish
 Almira Hart Lincoln Phelps
 Sarah Pierce
 Ellen Albertina Polyblank
 Sarah Porter
 Julia Richman
 Alice Mary Robertson
 Elizabeth Ann Rogers
 Susanna Haswell Rowson
 Mildred Lewis Rutherford
 Martha Schofield
 May Eliza Wright Sewall
 Mary Easton Sibley
 Anna Peck Sill
 Lucinda Hinsdale Stone
 Laura Matilda Towne
 Julia Strudwick Tutwiler
 Henrietta Benigna Justine Zinzendorf von Watteville
 Helen Magill White
 Emma Hart Willard
 Sophie Bell Wright
 Ella Flagg Young

Sculptors 

 Mary Abastenia St. Leger Eberle
 Harriet Goodhue Hosmer
 Edmonia Lewis
 Helen Farnsworth Mears
 Elisabet Ney
 Vinnie Ream
 Janet Scudder
 Emma Stebbins
 Anne Whitney
 Gertrude Vanderbilt Whitney
 Patience Lovell Wright

Settlement House Leaders 

 Grace Abbott
 Jane Addams
 Gertrude Barnum
 Cornelia Foster Bradford
 Anna Hempstead Branch
 Helena Stuart Dudley
 Lizzie Black Kander
 Florence Kelley
 Julia Clifford Lathrop
 Irene Lewisohn
 Mary Eliza McDowell
 Eleanor Laura McMain
 Katherine Pettit
 Jane Elizabeth Robbins
 Ellen Gates Starr
 Alzina Parsons Stevens
 Lillian D. Wald
 Elizabeth Sprague Williams

Social and Civic Reformers 

 Albion Fellows Bacon
 Kate Barnard
 Emily Perkins Bissell
 Lucretia Longshore Blankenburg
 Madeline McDowell Breckinridge
 Sophonisba Preston Breckinridge
 Helen Stuart Campbell
 Ellen Collins
 Katharine Coman
 Sallie Sims Southall Cotten
 Caroline Julia Bartlett Crane
 Annie Sturges Daniel
 Katharine Bement Davis
 Sarah Sophia Chase Piatt Decker
 Mary Clare de Graffenried
 Abby Morton Diaz
 Annie LePorte Diggs
 Crystal Eastman
 Katherine Philips Edson
 Hannah Bachman Einstein
 Charlotte Champe Stearns Eliot
 Elizabeth Glendower Evans
 Lucy Louisa Coues Flower
 Minnie Ursula Oliver Scott Rutherford Fuller
 Mary Smith Garrett
 Charlotte Anna Perkins Stetson Gilman
 Elisabeth Gilman
 Josephine Clara Goldmark
 Jean Margaret Gordon
 Kate M. Gordon
 Margaret Angela Haley
 Cornelia Hancock
 Frances Ellen Watkins Harper
 Ellen Martin Henrotin
 Lucy Virginia Dorsey lams
 Mary Hall Ingham
 Pattie Ruffner Jacobs
 Mary Morton Kimball Kehew
 Florence Kelley
 Susan Myra Kingsbury
 Alice Lakey
 Bertha Ethel Knight Landes
 Julia Clifford Lathrop
 Annie Laws
 Sophie Irene Simon Loeb
 Juliette Magill Kinzie Gordon Low
 Josephine Shaw Lowell
 George Madden Martin
 Abigail Williams May
 Helen Barrett Montgomery
 Belle Lindner Israels Moskowitz
 Mary Eno Bassett Mumford
 Mary Cooke Branch Munford
 Ellen Spencer Mussey
 Maud Nathan
 Caroline Love Goodwin O'Day
 Hannah Kent Schoff
 Louisa Lee Schuyler
 Hannah Greenebaum Solomon
 Anna Carpenter Garlin Spencer
 Alzina Parsons Stevens
 Caroline Phelps Stokes
 Olivia Egleston Phelps Stokes
 Eliza L. Sproat Randolph Turner
 Clara Hampson Ueland
 Lila Hardaway Meade Valentine
 Marie Louise Van Vorst
 Kate Gannett Wells
 Fannie Barrier Williams
 Caroline Bayard Stevens Wittpen
 Emma Carola Woerishoffer
 Edith Elmer Wood

See also Health Reform Advocates; Laborers; Settlement House Leaders

Social Economists 

 Josephine Clara Goldmark
 Susan Myra Kingsbury
 Jessica Blanche Peixotto
 Edith Elmer Wood
 Helen Laura Sumner Woodbury

Social Leaders 

 Marian Hooper Adams
 Caroline Webster Schermerhorn Astor
 Alva Erskine Smith Vanderbilt Belmont
 Anne Willing Bingham
 Anne Charlotte Lynch Botta
 Theodosia Burr
 Mary Gwendolin Caldwell
 Jennie Jerome Churchill
 Virginia Caroline Tunstall Clay-Clopton
 Anna Virginia Russell Cole
 Mary Victoria Leiter Curzon
 Mollie Evelyn Moore Davis
 Elsie De Wolfe
 Adele Cutts Douglas
 Annie Adams Fields
 Marian Graves Anthon Fish
 Rebecca Franks
 Isabella Stewart Gardner
 Elizabeth Graeme Ferguson
 Catherine Littlefield Greene
 Rose O'Neal Greenhow
 Constance Cary Harrison
 Harriet Lane Johnston
 Eliza Jumel
 Grace Elizabeth King
 Octavia Celeste Walton Le Vert
 Edith Rockefeller McCormick
 Evalyn Walsh McLean
 Dolley Payne Todd Madison
 Louise Chandler Moulton
 Bertha Honore Palmer
 Lucy Petway Holcombe Pickens
 Sara Agnes Rice Pryor
 Elisabeth Mills Reid
 Catherine Van Rensselaer Schuyler
 Mary Elizabeth Wilson Sherwood
 Margaret Bayard Smith
 Ellin Leslie Prince Lowery Speyer
 Kate Chase Sprague
 Blanche Oelrichs Thomas Barrymore Tweed
 Priscilla Cooper Tyler
 Elizebeth Thomas Werlein

Social Workers 

 Sophonisba Preston Breckinridge
 Emily Wayland Dinwiddie
 Mary Willcox Brown Glenn
 Susan Myra Kingsbury
 Alice Louise Higgins Lothrop
 Anna Beach Pratt
 Agnes Gertrude Regan
 Mary Ellen Richmond
 Zilpha Drew Smith

Socialists and Radicals 

 Martha Gallison Moore Avery
 Kate Richards O'Hare Cunningham
 Elizabeth Glendower Evans

Temperance Advocates 

 Elisabeth Gilman
 Emma Goldman
 Carrie Rand Herron
 Florence Kelley
 Maria Maud Leonard McCreery
 Helen Marot
 Caroline Amanda Sherfey Rand
 Lola Ridge
 Agnes Smedley
 Ellen Gates Starr
 Rose Harriet Pastor Stokes
 Frances Wright

Suffragists 

 Mathilde Franziska Giesler Anneke
 Susan Brownell Anthony
 Rachel G. Foster Avery
 Alva Erskine Smith Vanderbilt Belmont
 Emily Perkins Bissell
 Ada Matilda Cole Bittenbender
 Alice Stone Blackwell
 Antoinette Louisa Brown Blackwell
 Lillie Devereux Blake
 Lucretia Longshore Blankenburg
 Harriot Eaton Stanton Blatch
 Amelia Jenks Bloomer
 Inez Milholland Boissevain
 Madeline McDowell Breckinridge
 Olympia Brown
 Carrie Clinton Lane Chapman Catt
 Elizabeth Buffum Chace
 Ednah Dow Littlehale Cheney
 Grace Giddings Clarke
 Laura Clay
 Virginia Caroline Tunstall Clay-Clopton
 Clara Dorothy Bewick Colby
 Phoebe Wilson Couzins
 Hannah Maria Conant Tracy Cutler
 Katharine Bement Davis
 Mary Fenn Davis
 Paulina Kellogg Wright Davis
 Mary Coffin Ware Dennett
 Josephine Marshall Jewell Dodge
 Abigail Jane Scott Duniway
 Sarah Barnwell Elliott
 Clara Shortridge Foltz
 Minnie Ursula Oliver Scott Rutherford Fuller
 Matilda Joslyn Gage
 Helen Hamilton Gardener
 Jean Margaret Gordon
 Kate M. Gordon
 Laura de Force Gordon
 Helen Mar Jackson Gougar
 Mary Grew
 Josephine Sophia White Griffing
 Ida A. Husted Harper
 Louisine Waldron Elder Havemeyer
 Mary Garrett Hay
 Grace Raymond Hebard
 Isabella Beecher Hooker
 Jessie Annette Jack Hooper
 Julia Ward Howe
 Emily Howland
 Mary Hall Ingham
 Pattie Ruffner Jacobs
 Belle Kearney
 Harriet Burton Laidlaw
 Miriam Florence Folline Leslie
 Mary Ashton Rice Livermore
 Belva Ann Bennett McNall Lockwood
 Maria Maud Leonard McCreery
 Catharine Gouger Waugh McCulloch
 Abigail Williams May
 Caroline Elizabeth Thomas Merrick
 Virginia Louisa Minor
 Esther Hobart McQuigg Slack Morris
 Maud Nathan
 Hannah Jane Patterson
 Marilla Marks Young Ricker
 Harriet Jane Hanson Robinson
 Caroline Maria Seymour Severance
 May Eliza Wright Sewall
 Anna Howard Shaw
 Nettie Rogers Shuler
 Abby Hadassah Smith
 Julia Evelina Smith
 Elizabeth Cady Stanton
 Lucy Stone
 Martha Carey Thomas
 Mary Frame Myers Thomas
 Eliza L. Sproat Randolph Turner
 Clara Hampson Ueland
 Harriet Taylor Upton
 Lila Hardaway Meade Valentine
 Fanny Garrison Villard
 Catharine Van Valkenburg Waite
 Zerelda Gray Sanders Wallace
 Amanda M. Way
 Emmeline Blanche Woodward Wells
 Kate Gannett Wells
 Ida Bell Wells-Bamett
 Sue Shelton White
 Victoria Claflin Woodhull
 Maud Younger

Temperance Advocates 

 Hannah Clark Johnston Bailey
 Josephine Abiah Penfield Cushman Bateham
 Ada Matilda Cole Bittenbender
 Amelia Jenks Bloomer
 Martha McClellan Brown
 Matilda Bradley Carse
 Sarah Flournoy Moore Chapin
 Julia Colman
 Elizabeth Leslie Rous Comstock
 Judith Ellen Horton Foster
 Lydia Folger Fowler
 Minnie Ursula Oliver Scott Rutherford Fuller
 Frances Dana Barker Gage
 Anna Adams Gordon
 Helen Mar Jackson Gougar
 Frances Ellen Watkins Harper
 Mary Garrett Hay
 Mary Hannah Hanchett Hunt
 Belle Kearney
 Mary Greenleaf Clement Leavitt
 Mary Ashton Rice Livermore
 Caroline Elizabeth Thomas Merrick
 Emily Clark Huntington Miller
 Carry Amelia Moore Nation
 Hannah Whitall Smith
 Lillian Marion Norton Ames Stevens
 Eliza Daniel Stewart
 Cora Frances Stoddard
 Eliza Jane Trimble Thompson
 Zerelda Gray Sanders Wallace
 Amanda M. Way
 Frances Elizabeth Caroline Willard
 Jennie Fowler Willing
 Annie Turner Wittenmyer

Translators 

 Mary Louise Booth
 Hannah O'Brien Chaplin Conant
 Isabel Florence Hapgood
 Annie Aubertine Woodward Moore
 Katharine Prescott Wormeley

Welfare Work Leaders 

 Fanny Baker Ames
 Janie Porter Barrett
 Kate Harwood Waller Barrett
 Clara Barton
 Adèle Parmentier Bayer
 Joanna Graham Bethune
 Mabel Thorp Boardman
 Evangeline Cory Booth
 Maud Ballington Booth
 Eva del Vakia Bowles
 Harriet Starr Cannon
 Jennie Collins
 Mabel Cratty
 Vera Charlotte Scott Cushman
 Grace Hoadley Dodge
 Josephine Marshall Jewell Dodge
 Sarah Platt Haines Doremus
 Sister Elizabeth Fedde
 Annie Adams Fields
 Lucy Louisa Coues Flower
 Isabella Marshall Graham
 Rebecca Gratz
 Josephine Sophia White Griffing
 Elizabeth Schuyler Hamilton
 Margaret Gaffney Haughery
 Laura Smith Haviland
 Ellen Martin Henrotin
 Elizabeth Christophers Kimball Hobson
 Jane Currie Blaikie Höge
 Emily Huntington
 Addie D. Waites Hunton
 Frances Wisebart Jacobs
 Mother Mary Alphonsa Lathrop
 Josephine Shaw Lowell
 Victoria Earle Matthews
 Lucy Jane Rider Meyer
 Sister Anthony O'Connell
 Phoebe Worrall Palmer
 Sarah Anne Worthington King Peter
 Margaret Barrett Allen Prior
 Martha George Rogers Ripley
 Jane Marie Bancroft Robinson
 Mary Harriman Rumsey
 Mother Mary Baptist Russell
 Jessie Ethel Sampter
 Louisa Lee Schuyler
 Daisy Florence Simms
 Virginia Thrall Smith
 Hannah Greenebaum Solomon
 Henrietta Szold
 Kate Gannett Wells
 Louise Waterman Wise
 Annie Turner Wittenmyer
 Caroline Bayard Stevens Wittpen
 Sophie Bell Wright

See also Social Workers

Wives of the Presidents 

 Abigail Smith Adams
 Louisa Catherine Johnson Adams
 Ellen Lewis Herndon Arthur
 Frances Folsom Cleveland
 Abigail Powers Fillmore
 Lucretia Rudolph Garfield
 Florence Kling Harding
 Anna Symmes Harrison
 Caroline Lavinia Scott Harrison
 Mary Scott Dimmick Harrison
 Lucy Ware Webb Hayes
 Lou Henry Hoover
 Rachel Donelson Robards Jackson
 Martha Wayles Skelton Jefferson
 Eliza McCardle Johnson
 Mary Ann Todd Lincoln
 Ida Saxton McKinley
 Dolley Payne Todd Madison
 Elizabeth Kortright Monroe
 Jane Means Appleton Pierce
 Sarah Childress Polk
 Alice Hathaway Lee Roosevelt
 Edith Kermit Carow Roosevelt
 Helen Herron Taft
 Margaret Mackall Smith Taylor
 Julia Gardiner Tyler
 Letitia Christian Tyler
 Hannah Hoes Van Buren
 Martha Dandridge Custis Washington
 Ellen Louise Axson Wilson

Women's Club Leaders 

 Alice Josephine McLellan Birney
 Lucretia Longshore Blankenburg
 Hallie Quinn Brown
 Grace Giddings Clarke
 Sallie Sims Southall Cotten
 Jane Cunningham Croly
 Ann Pamela Cunningham
 Flora Adams Darling
 Sarah Sophia Chase Piatt Decker
 Ellen Louise Curtis Demorest
 Sarah Elizabeth Doyle
 Clara Driscoll
 Sarah J. Smith Thompson Garnet
 Frances Ellen Watkins Harper
 Ellen Martin Henrotin
 Julia Ward Howe
 Louisa Boyd Yeomans King
 Alice Lakey
 Bertha Ethel Knight Landes
 Annie Laws
 Roberta Campbell Lawson
 Victoria Earle Matthews
 Abigail Williams May
 Mary Eno Bassett Mumford
 Harriet Jane Hanson Robinson
 Josephine St. Pierre Ruffin
 Carolina Maria Seymour Severance
 May Eliza Wright Sewall
 Mary Belle King Sherman
 Katharine Margaret Brownlee Sherwood
 Nettie Rogers Shuler
 Hannah Greenebaum Solomon
 Lucinda Hinsdale Stone
 Eliza L. Sproat Randolph Turner
 Ellen Hardin Walworth
 Ida Bell Wells-Bamett
 Fannie Barrier Williams
 Alice Vivian Ames Winter

Women included in Volume 4

Agriculture and Rural Life 

 Mary Agnes Chase
 Minnie Fisher Cunningham
 Margaret Loyd Jarman Hagood
 Edith Elizabeth Lowry
 Edna Belle Sewell
 Jessie Field Shambaugh
 Louise Stanley

Anthropology and Folklore 

 Maria Cadilla de Martinez
 Ella Cara Deloria
 Frances Theresa Densmore
 Zora Neale Hurston
 Louise Pound
 Hortense Powdermaker
 Gladys Amanda Reichard
 Ruth Sawyer

Architecture 

 Nora Stanton Barney
 Catherine Krouse Bauer
 Marion Mahony Griffin
 Sophia Gregoria Hayden
 Julia Morgan

See also Landscape Architecture

Art 

 Blanche Ames
 Romaine Brooks
 Katherine Sophie Dreier
 Meta Vaux Warrick Fuller
 Marion Mahony Griffin
 Edith Gregor Halpert
 Eva Hesse
 Malvina Cornell Hoffman
 Anna Vaughn Hyatt Huntington
 Adelaide Johnson
 Dorothy Wright Liebes
 Dorothy Eugenia Miner
 Anna Mary Robertson (Grandma) Moses
 Irene Rice Pereira
 Hilla Rebay
 Gisela Marie Augusta Richter
 Anne Ryan
 Aline Milton Bernstein Saarinen
 Kay Linn Sage
 Augusta Christine Savage
 Mary Hamilton Swindler

See also Photography

Astronomy 

 Antonia Caetana De Paiva Pereira Maury

Aviation 

 Ruth Rowland Nichols
 Phoebe Jane Fairgrave Omlie
 Mabel Walker Willebrandt

Biology 

 Rachel Louise Carson
 Ethel Browne Harvey
 Libbie Henrietta Hyman
 Ann Haven Morgan
 Margaret Morse Nice

Birth Control 

 Blanche Ames Ames
 Sophia Josephine Kleegman
 Lena Levine
 Katharine Dexter McCormick
 Margaret Sanger
 Gertrude Agnes Muller
 Mary Engle Pennington
 Marjorie Merriweather Post
 Ida Cohen Rosenthal
 Helena Rubinstein
 Margaret Fogarty Rudkin
 Dorothy Shaver
 Annie Minerva Turnbo-Malone
 Ruth Fanshaw Waldo
 Ethel Berenice Weed
 Eartha Mary Magdalene White

Chemistry 

 Emma Perry Carr
 Mary Engle Pennington

See also Medicine: Researchers; Nutrition

Botany 

 Emma Lucy Braun
 Mary Agnes Chase
 Alice Eastwood
 Margaret Clay Ferguson

Broadcasting 

 Gracie Allen
 Gertrude Edelstein Berg
 Fanny Brice
 Dorothy Lerner Gordon
 Frieda Barkin Hennock
 Hattie McDaniel
 Nila Mack
 Agnes Moorehead
 Irna Phillips
 Aline Milton Bernstein Saarinen
 Dorothy Thompson
 Judith Cary Waller

Children's Literature 

 May Hill Arbuthnot
 Margaret Wise Brown
 Esther Forbes
 Inez Haynes Gillmore Irwin
 May Massee
 Bertha Mahony Miller
 Lucy Sprague Mitchell
 Anne Carroll Moore
 Ruth Sawyer
 Laura Ingalls Wilder

Civil Liberties 

 Elizabeth Gurley Flynn
 Jessie Wallace Hughan
 Dorothy Kenyon
 Carol Weiss King
 Business
 Polly Adler
 Elizabeth Arden
 Beatrice Fox Auerbach
 Nora Stanton Barney
 Hattie Carnegie
 Christine McGaffey Frederick
 Lillian Moller Gilbreth
 Jennie Grossinger
 Edith Gregor Halpert
 Elizabeth Hawes
 Blanche Wolf Knopf
 Dorothy Wright Liebes
 Perle Mesta
 Julia Morgan

Civil Rights 

 Jessie Daniel Ames
 Josephine Baker
 Mary Cornelia Barker
 Charlotta Spears Bass
 Mary McLeod Bethune
 Crystal Dreda Bird Fauset
 Irene McCoy Gaines
 Lorraine Hansberry
 Elizabeth Ross Haynes
 Alice Mae Lee Jemison
 Daisy Elizabeth Adams Lampkin
 Mary White Ovington
 Eslanda Cardoza Goode Robeson
 Ruby Doris Smith-Robinson
 Anna Eleanor Roosevelt
 Lillian Smith
 Mary Church Terrell
 Dorothy Eugenia Rogers Tilly

Classics and Archaeology 

 Hetty Goldman
 Edith Hamilton
 Gisela Marie Augusta Richter
 Mary Hamilton Swindler
 Lily Ross Taylor

Community Affairs 

 Beatrice Fox Auerbach
 Jennie Loitman Barron
 Louise deKoven Bowen
 Selena Sloan Butler
 Eunice Hunton Carter
 Minnie Fisher Cunningham
 Frances Elliott Davis
 Ethel Sturges Dummer
 Irene McCoy Gaines
 Edna Fischel Gellhorn
 Elizabeth Ross Haynes
 Ima Hogg
 Alice Mae Lee Jemison
 Rebekah Bettelheim Kohut
 Daisy Elizabeth Adams Lampkin
 Belle Sherwin
 Mary Church Terrell
 Marguerite Milton Wells
 Eartha Mary Magdalene White
 Muriel Hazel Wright

Conservation 

 Mary Lee Jobe Akeley
 Emma Lucy Braun
 Rachel Louise Carson
 Alice Eastwood
 Ann Haven Morgan
 Margaret Morse Nice
 Consumer Affairs
 Mildred Edie Brady
 Persia Crawford Campbell
 Mary Williams Dewson
 Elinore Morehouse Herrick
 Dorothy Kenyon
 Hazel Kyrk
 Lucy Randolph Mason
 Frances Perkins
 Louise Stanley

Cookery 

 Adelle Davis
 Irma Louise von Starkloff Rombauer
 Margaret Fogarty Rudkin
 Alice Babette Toklas

Dance 

 Elizabeth Burchenal
 Irene Castle
 Marian Chace
 Doris Humphrey
 Ruth St. Denis
 Helen Tamiris

Demography 

 Margaret Loyd Jarman Hagood
 Irene Barnes Taeuber

Economics 

 Emily Greene Balch
 Persia Crawford Campbell
 Hazel Kyrk
 Anna Rochester (see under Grace Hutchins)
 Theresa Wolfson

Education

College Founders and Administrators 

 Mary McLeod Bethune
 Katharine Blunt
 Margaret Antoinette Clapp
 Ada Louise Comstock
 Mother Mary Katharine Drexel
 Hallie Mae Ferguson Flanagan
 Virginia Crocheron Gildersleeve
 Alice Spencer Geddes Lloyd
 Annie Nathan Meyer
 Lucy Sprague Mitchell
 Matilda Smyrell Calder Thurston
 Edna Noble White
 Sister Madeleva (Mary Evaline) Wolff

School Founders and Administrators 

 Ethel Percy Andrus
 May Hill Arbuthnot
 Mary Cornelia Barker
 Mary McLeod Bethune
 Charlotte Eugenia Hawkins Brown
 Nannie Helen Burroughs
 Flora Juliette Cooke
 Anna Julia Haywood Cooper
 Maude Frazier
 Edith Hamilton
 Helen Ira Jarrell
 Rebekah Bettelheim Kohut
 Alice Spencer Geddes Lloyd
 Georgia Lee Witt Lusk
 Louise Leonard McLaren
 Helen Parkhurst
 Jessie Field Shambaugh
 Catherine Brieger Stern

Writers and Researchers 

 May Hill Arbuthnot
 Dorothy Canfield Fisher
 Florence Laura Goodenough
 Sidonie Matsner Gruenberg
 Clara Savage Littledale
 Lucy Sprague Mitchell
 Catherine Brieger Stern
 Ruth May Strang
 Hilda Taba

Other 

 Mary Cornelia Barker
 Jennie Loitman Barron
 Anita McCormick Blaine
 Selma Munter Borchardt
 Selena Sloan Butler
 Ethel Sturges Dummer
 Dorothy Canfield Fisher
 Jessie Wallace Hughan
 Helen Ira Jarrell
 Agnes Ernst Meyer
 Mary Church Terrell
 Winifred Louise Ward

See also Physical Education

Engineering and Industrial Design 

 Nora Stanton Barney
 Edith Clarke
 Irmgard Flügge-Lotz
 Lillian Moller Gilbreth
 Gertrude Agnes Muller
 Mary Engle Pennington
 Marie Gertrude Rand

Entertainment 

 Gracie Allen
 Josephine Baker
 Fanny Brice
 Irene Castle
 Judy Garland
 Sonja Henie
 Billie Holiday
 Janis Lyn Joplin
 Gypsy Rose Lee
 Sophie Tucker

Exploration 

 Mary Lee Jobe Akeley
 Grace Gallatin Seton

Fashion 

 Aline Frankau Bernstein
 Hattie Carnegie
 Edna Woolman Chase
 Elizabeth Hawes
 Dorothy Wright Liebes
 Claire McCardell
 Ida Cohen Rosenthal
 Dorothy Shaver

Feminism 

 Blanche Ames Ames
 Nora Stanton Barney
 Mary Elizabeth Bass
 Mary Ritter Beard
 Emily Newell Blair
 Maria Cadilla de Martinez
 Lavinia Lloyd Dock
 Elizabeth Hawes
 Inez Haynes Gillmore Irwin
 Adelaide Johnson
 Dorothy Kenyon
 Gail Laughlin
 Muna Lee
 Esther Pohl Lovejoy
 Katharine Dexter McCormick
 Anne Henrietta Martin
 Perle Mesta
 Emma Guffey Miller
 Lena Madesin Phillips
 Anita Lily Pollitzer
 Ruth Bryan Owen Rohde
 Margaret Sanger
 Ann London Scott
 Grace Gallatin Seton
 Bertha Van Hoosen
 Mabel Vernon

Film 

 Theda Bara
 Iris Barry
 Anne Bauchens
 Clara Gordon Bow
 Maya Deren
 Judy Garland
 Dorothy Gish
 Betty Grable
 Susan Hayward
 Sonja Henie
 Judy Holliday
 Hedda Hopper
 Hattie McDaniel
 Jeanette MacDonald
 Frances Marion
 Marilyn Monroe
 Agnes Moorehead
 Dorothy Rothschild Parker
 Louella Oettinger Parsons
 ZaSu Pitts
 Anna May Wong
 Blanche Yurka

Geology 

 Tilly Edinger
 Julia Anna Gardner
 Winifred Goldring
 Eleanora Frances Bliss Knopf

Government and Politics

Appointees 

 Annette Abbott Adams
 Mary Anderson
 Mary McLeod Bethune
 Esther Caukin Brunauer
 Persia Crawford Campbell
 Margaret Antoinette Clapp
 Hallie Mae Ferguson Flanagan
 Maude Frazier
 Florence Jaffray Hurst Harriman
 Frieda Barkin Hennock
 Jane Margueretta Hoey
 Muna Lee
 Perle Mesta
 Frieda Segelke Miller
 Frances Perkins
 Ivy Maude Baker Priest
 Ruth Bryan Owen Rohde
 Anna Eleanor Roosevelt
 Louise Stanley
 Mary Elizabeth Switzer
 Mary Abby Van Kleeck
 Ellen Sullivan Woodward

Congresswomen 

 Georgia Lee Witt Lusk
 Helen Douglas Mankin
 Mary Teresa Hopkins Norton
 Jeannette Pickering Rankin
 Edith Nourse Rogers
 Ruth Bryan Owen Rohde

Other Elected Officials 

 Crystal Dreda Bird Fauset
 Miriam Amanda Wallace Ferguson
 Maude Frazier
 Gail Laughlin
 Georgia Lee Witt Lusk
 Helen Douglas Mankin
 Ivy Maude Baker Priest
 Nellie Nugent Somerville
 Ellen Sullivan Woodward

Party Workers and Officials 

 Annette Abbott Adams
 Charlotta Spears Bass
 Emily Newell Blair
 Genevieve Rose Cline
 Minnie Fisher Cunningham
 Mary Williams Dewson
 Crystal Dreda Bird Fauset
 Irene McCoy Gaines
 Florence Jaffray Hurst Harriman
 Emma Guffey Miller
 Cornelia Elizabeth Bryce Pinchot
 Ivy Maude Baker Priest
 Pauline Morton Sabin

Wives of Presidents 

 Grace Anna Goodhue Coolidge
 Anna Eleanor Roosevelt
 Edith Boiling Galt Wilson

History 

 Mary Ritter Beard
 Catherine Shober Drinker Bowen
 Margaret Antoinette Clapp
 Anna Julia Haywood Cooper
 Esther Forbes
 Constance McLaughlin Green
 Beatrice Fry Hyslop
 Bertha Haven Putnam
 Mary Clabaugh Wright
 Muriel Hazel Wright

Home Economics 

 Katharine Blunt
 Christine McGaffey Frederick
 Lillian Moller Gilbreth
 Hazel Kyrk
 Agnes Fay Morgan
 Lydia Jane Roberts
 Louise Stanley
 Edna Noble White

Housing Reform 

 Catherine Krouse Bauer
 Mary Kingsbury Simkhovitch
 International Affairs
 Esther Caukin Brunauer
 Vera Micheles Dean
 Muna Lee
 Anne Elizabeth O'Hare McCormick
 Anna Eleanor Roosevelt
 Dorothy Thompson
 Ruth Frances Woodsmall

Journalism 

 Charlotta Spears Bass
 Mildred Edie Brady
 Julia de Burgos
 Elisabeth May Adams Craig
 Minnie Fisher Cunningham
 Doris Fleeson
 Bess Furman
 Elizabeth Meriwether (Dorothy Dix) Gilmer
 Dorothy Lerner Gordon
 Josephine Herbst
 Elinore Morehouse Herrick
 Lorena Hickok
 Marguerite Higgins
 Hedda Hopper
 Alice Mae Lee Jemison
 Clara Savage Littledale
 Alice Spencer Geddes Lloyd
 Anne Elizabeth O'Hare McCormick
 Agnes Ernst Meyer
 Louella Oettinger Parsons
 Alicia Patterson
 Emily Price Post
 Helen Miles Rogers Reid
 Jane Parker Deeter Rippin
 Anna Eleanor Roosevelt
 Aline Milton Bernstein Saarinen
 Anna Louise Strong
 Dorothy Thompson
 Irita Bradford Van Doren
 Mary Heaton Vorse

Labor 

 Mary Anderson
 Mary Cornelia Barker
 Ella Reeve Bloor
 Selma Munter Borchardt
 Elisabeth Christman
 Fannia Mary Cohn
 Gladys Marie Dickason
 Mary Elisabeth Dreier
 Elizabeth Gurley Flynn
 Elizabeth Hawes
 Elinore Morehouse Herrick
 Grace Hutchins
 Helen Ira Jarrell
 Frances Kellor
 Louise Leonard McLaren
 Lucy Randolph Mason
 Frieda Segelke Miller
 Mary Teresa Hopkins Norton
 Julia Sarsfield O'Connor Parker
 Frances Perkins
 Rose Pesotta
 Rose Schneiderman
 Florence Calvert Thorne
 Mary Abby Van Kleeck
 Mary Heaton Vorse
 Theresa Wolfson

Landscape Architecture 

 Beatrix Jones Farrand

Law 

 Annette Abbott Adams
 Florence Ellinwood Allen
 Jennie Loitman Barron
 Mary Margaret Bartelme
 Selma Munter Borchardt
 Eunice Hunton Carter
 Genevieve Rose Cline
 Frieda Barkin Hennock
 Dorothy Kenyon
 Carol Weiss King
 Gail Laughlin
 Helen Douglas Mankin
 Lena Madesin Phillips
 Mabel Walker Willebrandt

Librarianship 

 Linda Anne Eastman
 Helen Elizabeth Haines
 Anne Carroll Moore
 Isadore Gilbert Mudge

Literature

Editors and Publishers 

 Margaret Carolyn Anderson
 Sylvia Woodbridge Beach
 Jessie Redmon Fauset
 Jane Heap (see under Margaret Carolyn Anderson)
 Blanche Wolf Knopf
 Amy Loveman
 Marianne Craig Moore
 Irita Bradford Van Doren

Scholars 

 Louise Pound
 Vida Dutton Scudder
 Rosemond Tuve
 Helen Constance White

Translators 

 Louise Bogan
 Hilda (H.D.) Doolittle
 Edith Hamilton
 Muna Lee
 Helen Tracy Lowe-Porter
 Marianne Craig Moore

Writers 

 Natalie Barney
 Iris Barry
 Emily Newell Blair
 Louise Bogan
 Catherine Shober Drinker Bowen
 Pearl Buck
 Julia de Burgos
 Maria Cadilla de Martinez
 Hilda (H.D.) Doolittle
 Jessie Redmon Fauset
 Edna Ferber
 Sara Bard Field
 Dorothy Canfield Fisher
 Esther Forbes
 Edith Hamilton
 Josephine Herbst
 Fannie Hurst
 Zora Neale Hurston
 Inez Haynes Gillmore Irwin
 Shirley Hardie Jackson
 Helen Keller
 Gypsy Rose Lee
 Muna Lee
 Helen Tracy Lowe-Porter
 Mabel Dodge Luhan
 Carson McCullers
 Lucy Sprague Mitchell
 Annie Nathan Meyer
 Marianne Craig Moore
 Kathleen Thompson Norris
 Flannery O'Connor
 Dorothy Rothschild Parker
 Sylvia Plath
 Emily Price Post
 Marjorie Kinnan Rawlings
 Mary Roberts Rinehart
 Mari Sandoz
 Grace Gallatin Seton
 Anne Gray Harvey Sexton
 Lillian Smith
 Ruth Suckow
 Alice Babette Toklas
 Mary Heaton Vorse
 Helen Constance White
 Laura Ingalls Wilder
 Sister Madeleva (Mary Evaline) Wolff
 Anzia Yezierska

Magazine and Journal Editing 

 Edith Abbott
 Mildred Edie Brady
 Edna Woolman Chase
 Vera Micheles Dean
 Edith Juliet Rich Isaacs
 Clara Savage Littledale
 Bertha Mahony Miller
 Dorothy Eugenia Miner
 Mary May Roberts
 Ruth May Strang
 Mary Hamilton Swindler
 Muriel Hazel Wright

Mathematics 

 Irmgard Flügge-Lotz
 Hilda Geiringer
 Margaret Loyd Jarman Hagood
 Catherine Brieger Stern
 Anna Johnson Pell Wheeler

Medicine

Physicians 

 Hattie Elizabeth Alexander
 Dorothy Hansine Andersen
 Virginia Apgar
 Mary Elizabeth Bass
 Gerty Theresa Radnitz Cori
 Gladys Rowena Henry Dick
 Helen Flanders Dunbar
 Ethel Collins Dunham
 Virginia Kneeland Frantz
 Frieda Fromm-Reichmann
 Grace Arabell Goldsmith
 Rosetta Sherwood Hall
 Alice Hamilton
 Karen Danielsen Homey
 Sara Claudia Murray Jordan
 Sophia Josephine Kleegman
 Elise Strang L'Esperance
 Lena Levine
 Esther Pohl Lovejoy
 Madge Thurlow Macklin
 Dorothy Reed Mendenhall
 Lillie Rosa Minoka-Hill
 Louise Pearce
 Florence Rena Sabin
 Ida Sophia Scudder
 Clara Thompson
 Bertha Van Hoosen
 Anna Wessels Williams

Researchers 

 Hattie Elizabeth Alexander
 Dorothy Hansine Andersen
 Gerty Theresa Radnitz Cori
 Gladys Rowena Henry Dick
 Alice Catherine Evans
 Virginia Kneeland Frantz
 Grace Arabell Goldsmith
 Elizabeth Lee Hazen
 Elise Strang L'Esperance
 Madge Thurlow Macklin
 Dorothy Reed Mendenhall
 Louise Pearce
 Judith Graham Pool
 Jane Anne Russell
 Florence Rena Sabin
 Maud Slye
 Anna Wessels Williams

Military 

 Florence Aby Blanchfield
 Virginia Crocheron Gildersleeve
 Edith Nourse Rogers
 Ethel Berenice Weed
 Ruth Frances Woodsmall

Music 

 Marion Eugénie Bauer
 Elizabeth Sprague Coolidge
 Ruth Porter Crawford-Seeger
 Mabel Wheeler Daniels
 Frances Theresa Densmore
 Angela Diller
 Emma Hayden Eames
 Geraldine Farrar
 Dorothy Fields
 Mary Garden
 Judy Garland
 Hazel Lucile Harrison
 Billie Holiday
 Mahalia Jackson
 Janis Lyn Joplin
 Ethel Leginska
 Hattie McDaniel
 Jeanette MacDonald
 Marian Griswold Nevins MacDowell
 Abbie Mitchell
 Florence Beatrice Smith Price
 Grace Harriet Spofford
 Helen Mulford Thompson
 Jennie Tourel
 Helen Francesca Traubel
 Mary Louise Curtis Bok Zimbalist

Nursing 

 Margaret Gene Arnstein
 Florence Aby Blanchfield
 Mary Breckinridge
 Frances Elliott Davis
 Lavinia Lloyd Dock
 Mary Sewall Gardner
 Annie Warburton Goodrich
 Mary May Roberts
 Margaret Sanger
 Belle Sherwin
 Isabel Maitland Stewart
 Carolyn Conant Van Blarcom

Nutrition 

 Katharine Blunt
 Adelle Davis
 Grace Arabell Goldsmith
 Agnes Fay Morgan
 Lydia Jane Roberts
 Louise Stanley

Peace 

 Nora Stanton Barney
 Emily Greene Balch
 Alice Hamilton
 Georgia Elma Harkness
 Jessie Wallace Hughan
 Hannah Hallowell Clothier Hull
 Grace Hutchins
 Anne Henrietta Martin
 Jeannette Pickering Rankin
 Vida Dutton Scudder
 Ruth Suckow
 Mary Church Terrell
 Mabel Vernon

Penology and Criminology 

 Mary Margaret Bartelme
 Louise deKoven Bowen
 Augusta Fox Bronner
 Mary Williams Dewson
 Ethel Sturges Dummer
 Mary Belle Harris
 Eleanor Touroff Glueck
 Jane Parker Deeter Rippin
 Miriam Van Waters
 Mabel Walker Willebrandt

Philanthropy 

 Anita McCormick Blaine
 Louise deKoven Bowen
 Elizabeth Sprague Coolidge
 Ethel Sturges Dummer
 Jennie Grossinger
 Jane Margueretta Hoey
 Ima Hogg
 Fannie Hurst
 Katharine Dexter McCormick
 Agnes Ernst Meyer
 Anne Tracy Morgan
 Marjorie Merriweather Post
 Helena Rubinstein
 Sophie Tucker
 Annie Minerva Turnbo-Malone
 Mary Louise Curtis Bok Zimbalist

Philosophy 

 Hannah Arendt

Photography 

 Mary Lee Jobe Akeley
 Diane Nemerov Arbus
 Margaret Bourke-White
 Frances Benjamin Johnston
 Dorothea Lange

Physical Education 

 Jessie Hubbell Bancroft
 Elizabeth Burchenal
 Frances Kellor
 Ethel Perrin

Physics 

 Elda Emma Anderson
 Maria Gertrude Goeppert Mayer
 Marie Gertrude Rand
 Political Science
 Hannah Arendt
 Vera Micheles Dean

Psychiatry and Psychoanalysis 

 Helen Flanders Dunbar
 Frieda Fromm-Reichmann
 Karen Danielsen Horney
 Lena Levine
 Clara Thompson
 Psychology
 Augusta Fox Bronner
 Charlotte Bertha Bühler
 Else Frenkel-Brunswik
 Lillian Moller Gilbreth
 Florence Laura Goodenough
 Marie Gertrude Rand
 Ruth May Strang
 Jessie Taft
 Hilda Taba

Public Health 

 Elda Emma Anderson
 Virginia Apgar
 Margaret Gene Arnstein
 Mary Breckinridge
 Frances Elliott Davis
 Gladys Rowena Henry Dick
 Lavinia Lloyd Dock
 Ethel Collins Dunham
 Alice Catherine Evans
 Mary Sewall Gardner
 Grace Arabell Goldsmith
 Alice Hamilton
 Elizabeth Lee Hazen
 Mary Cromwell Jarrett
 Elise Strang L'Esperance
 Esther Pohl Lovejoy
 Dorothy Reed Mendenhall
 Louise Pearce
 Mary Engle Pennington
 Florence Rena Sabin
 Carolyn Conant Van Blarcom
 Anna Wessels Williams

Religion 

 Ella Alexander Boole
 Nannie Helen Burroughs
 Donaldina Mackenzie Cameron
 Mother Mary Katharine Drexel
 Helen Flanders Dunbar
 Rosetta Sherwood Hall
 Georgia Elma Harkness
 Hannah Hallowell Clothier Hull
 Mahalia Jackson
 Rebekah Bettelheim Kohut
 Edith Elizabeth Lowry
 Mary Ely Lyman
 Mother Mary Joseph (Mary Josephine) Rogers
 Ida Sophia Scudder
 Vida Dutton Scudder
 Matilda Smyrell Calder Thurston
 Dorothy Eugenia Rogers Tilly
 Sister Madeleva (Mary Evaline) Wolff

Settlements 

 Emily Greene Balch
 Louise deKoven Bowen
 Donaldina Mackenzie Cameron
 Angela Diller
 Lavinia Lloyd Dock
 Alice Hamilton
 Mary White Ovington
 Vida Dutton Scudder
 Mary Kingsbury Simkhovitch
 Grace Harriet Spofford
 Eartha Mary Magdalene White

Socialism and Radicalism 

 Angela Bambace
 Ella Reeve Bloor
 Elizabeth Gurley Flynn
 Josephine Herbst
 Jessie Wallace Hughan
 Helen Keller
 Carol Weiss King
 Eslanda Cardoza Goode Robeson
 Ethel Greenglass Rosenberg
 Vida Dutton Scudder
 Anna Louise Strong
 Mary Abby Van Kleeck

Social Reform 

 Edith Abbott
 Emily Greene Balch
 Donaldina Mackenzie Cameron
 Mary Williams Dewson
 Lavinia Lloyd Dock
 Mary Elisabeth Dreier
 Alice Hamilton
 Helen Keller
 Frances Kellor
 Dorothy Kenyon
 Lucy Randolph Mason
 Frances Perkins
 Anna Eleanor Roosevelt
 Rose Schneiderman
 Vida Dutton Scudder
 Mary Kingsbury Simkhovitch
 Mary Church Terrell
 Mary Abby Van Kleeck

Social Research 

 Edith Abbott
 Joanna Carver Colcord
 Mary Williams Dewson
 Margaret Loyd Jarman Hagood
 Elizabeth Ross Haynes
 Frances Kellor
 Emma Octavia Lundberg
 Frieda Segelke Miller
 Mary White Ovington
 Mary Abby Van Kleeck
 Theresa Wolfson

Social Welfare 

 Ethel Percy Andrus
 Edith Terry Bremer
 Pearl Buck
 Ethel Sturges Dummer
 Helen Keller
 Rebekah Bettelheim Kohut
 Rose Hum Lee
 Edith Elizabeth Lowry
 Anne Tracy Morgan
 Mary Elizabeth Switzer
 Eartha Mary Magdalene White

Social Work 

 Edith Abbott
 Edith Terry Bremer
 Ida Maud Cannon
 Joanna Carver Colcord
 Grace Longwell Coyle
 Mary Williams Dewson
 Eleanor Touroff Glueck
 Gordon Hamilton
 Jane Margueretta Hoey
 Mary Cromwell Jarrett
 Emma Octavia Lundberg
 Lydia Rapoport
 Jane Parker Deeter Rippin
 Jessie Taft
 Charlotte Helen Towle
 Miriam Van Waters

Sociology 

 Eleanor Touroff Glueck
 Margaret Loyd Jarman Hagood
 Rose Hum Lee
 Irene Barnes Taeuber

Sports 

 Sonja Henie
 Louise Pound
 Eleonora Randolph Sears
 Hazel Hotchkiss Wightman
 Mildred Ella Didrikson Zaharias / Babe Didrikson Zaharias

Suffrage 

 Florence Ellinwood Allen
 Blanche Ames Ames
 Jessie Daniel Ames
 Nora Stanton Barney
 Mary Ritter Beard
 Emily Newell Blair
 Ella Reeve Bloor
 Louise deKoven Bowen
 Lucy Burns
 Maria Cadilla de Martinez
 Mary Agnes Chase
 Minnie Fisher Cunningham
 Mary Williams Dewson
 Lavinia Lloyd Dock
 Katherine Sophie Dreier
 Mary Elisabeth Dreier
 Sara Bard Field
 Edna Fischel Gellhorn
 Hannah Hallowell Clothier Hull
 Inez Haynes Gillmore Irwin
 Adelaide Johnson
 Daisy Elizabeth Adams Lampkin
 Gail Laughlin
 Katharine Dexter McCormick
 Anne Henrietta Martin
 Emma Guffy Miller
 Maud Wood Park
 Cornelia Elizabeth Bryce Pinchot
 Anita Lily Pollitzer
 Jeannette Pickering Rankin
 Helen Miles Rogers Reid
 Rose Schneiderman
 Grace Gallatin Seton
 Belle Sherwin
 Nellie Nugent Somerville
 Mary Church Terrell
 Mabel Vernon
 Marguerite Milton Wells

Antisuffrage 

 Annie Nathan Meyer

Temperance and Prohibition 

 Ella Alexander Boole
 Kathleen Thompson Norris
 Nellie Nugent Somerville
 Mabel Walker Willebrandt

Prohibition Repeal 

 Emma Guffey Miller
 Pauline Morton Sabin

Theater 

 Maude Adams
 Tallulah Brockman Bankhead
 Ethel Barrymore
 Gertrude Edelstein Berg
 Aline Frankau Bernstein
 Katharine Cornell
 Rachel Crothers
 Ruth Draper
 Edna Ferber
 Dorothy Fields
 Hallie Mae Ferguson Flanagan
 Berta Gersten
 Lorraine Hansberry
 Theresa Helburn
 Judy Holliday
 Edith Juliet Rich Isaacs
 Margo Jones
 Carson McCullers
 Abbie Mitchell
 Agnes Moorehead
 Jean Rosenthal
 Winifred Louise Ward
 Margaret Webster
 Blanche Yurka

Women's Organizations

American Association of University Women 

 Esther Caukin Brunauer
 Ada Louise Comstock
 Virginia Crocheron Gildersleeve
 Helen Constance White

League of Women Voters 

 Jessie Daniel Ames
 Emily Newell Blair
 Minnie Fisher Cunningham
 Edna Fischel Gellhorn
 Lucy Randolph Mason
 Emma Guffey Miller
 Maud Wood Park
 Belle Sherwin
 Marguerite Milton Wells

National Association of Colored Women 

 Mary McLeod Bethune
 Selena Sloan Butler
 Irene McCoy Gaines
 Elizabeth Ross Haynes
 Daisy Elizabeth Adams Lampkin
 Mary Church Terrell

National Council of Negro Women 

 Mary McLeod Bethune
 Charlotte Eugenia Hawkins Brown
 Eunice Hunton Carter
 Daisy Elizabeth Adams Lampkin
 Mary Church Terrell

National Federation of Business and Professional Women 

 Gail Laughlin
 Lena Madesin Phillips

National Woman's Party 

 Nora Stanton Barney
 Mary Ritter Beard
 Lucy Burns
 Lavinia Lloyd Dock
 Sara Bard Field
 Inez Haynes Gillmore Irwin
 Gail Laughlin
 Muna Lee
 Anne Henrietta Martin
 Perle Mesta
 Emma Guffey Miller
 Anita Lily Pollitzer
 Mabel Vernon

Women's International League for Peace and Freedom 

 Emily Greene Balch
 Hannah Hallowell Clothier Hull
 Anne Henrietta Martin
 Jeannette Pickering Rankin
 Mary Church Terrell
 Mabel Vernon

Women's Trade Union League 

 Mary Anderson
 Emily Greene Balch
 Elisabeth Christman
 Mary Elisabeth Dreier
 Frieda Segelke Miller
 Julia Sarsfield O'Connor Parker
 Rose Schneiderman

YWCA 

 Edith Terry Bremer
 Charlotte Eugenia Hawkins Brown
 Eunice Hunton Carter
 Grace Longwell Coyle
 Crystal Dreda Bird Fauset
 Elizabeth Ross Haynes
 Louise Leonard McLaren
 Lucy Randolph Mason
 Lena Madesin Phillips
 Jessie Field Shambaugh
 Ruth Frances Woodsmall

Other 

 Jessie Daniel Ames
 Genevieve Rose Cline
 Meta Vaux Warrick Fuller
 Rebekah Bettelheim Kohut
 Anne Tracy Morgan
 Jane Parker Deeter Rippin
 Edna Belle Sewell
 Dorothy Eugenia Rogers Tilly
 Ethel Berenice Weed

Women included in Volume 5

Advertising/Public Relations 

 Doris E. Fleischman Bernays
 Anne Hummert
 Anna Marie Lederer Rosenberg

Anthropology/Folklore 

 Theodora Mead Abel
 Ruth Leah Bunzel
 Lydia Cabrera
 Eleanor Leacock
 Margaret Mead
 Pearl Primus
 Mary Pukui
 Te Ata
 Ruth Murray Underhill

Archaeology/Classics 

 Margarete Bieber
 Marija BirutÏ AlseikaitÏ Gimbutas
 Tatiana Proskouriakoff
 Hannah Marie Wormington

Architecture 

 Elisabeth Coit
 Esther McCoy
 Lutah Maria Riggs

Art 

 Kathy Acker
 Anni Albers
 Djuna Barnes
 Gwendolyn Bennett
 Isabel Bishop
 Selma Burke
 Lydia Cabrera
 Theresa Hak Kyung Cha
 Elaine de Kooning
 Dominique De Menil
 Ray Eames
 Angna Enters
 Marsha Gomez
 Nancy Graves
 Clementine Hunter
 Estelle Ishigo
 Miyoko Ito
 Lois Mailou Jones
 Corita Kent
 Lee Krasner
 Ana Mendieta
 Joan Mitchell
 Alice Neel
 Louise Nevelson
 Georgia O'Keeffe
 Betty Parsons
 Marjorie Acker Phillips
 Hannah Wilke

Art Collectors/Dealers 

 Dominique De Menil
 Peggy Guggenheim
 Betty Parsons
 Marjorie Acker Phillips

Astronomy 

 Cecilia Payne-Gaposchkin
 Beatrice Muriel Tinsley

Aviation 

 Olive Ann Mellor Beech
 Jacqueline Cochran
 Joy Bright Hancock
 Nancy Harkness Love
 Christa McAuliffe
 Jeannette Ridlon Piccard
 Judith Resnik
 Katherine Stinson
 Louise Thaden

Biochemistry 

 Rachel Fuller Brown
 Gertrude Belle Elion
 Charlotte Friend
 Gladys Hobby
 Rebecca Craighill Lancefield
 Barbara McClintock
 Ruth Sager
 Dorothy Maud Wrinch

Biology 

 Ruth Harriet Bleier
 Mary (Polly) Ingraham Bunting
 Dian Fossey
 Charlotte Friend
 Gladys Hobby
 Rebecca Craighill Lancefield
 Barbara McClintock
 Jane Marion Oppenheimer
 Dixy Lee Ray
 Ruth Sager
 Berta Vogel Scharrer

Birth Control/Family Planning 

 Mary Steichen Calderone
 Estelle Trebert Griswold
 Mary Woodard Reinhardt Lasker
 Emily Hartshorne Mudd
 Harriet Fleischl Pilpel

Botany 

 Katherine Esau
 Katharine Ordway

Business/Entrepreneurship 

 Lucille Ball
 Olive Ann Mellor Beech
 Doris E. Fleischman Bernays
 Mary Clifford Caperton Bingham
 Hazel Gladys Bishop
 Connie Boucher
 Dorothy Buffum Chandler
 Joyce Chen
 Georgia Neese Clark
 Jacqueline Cochran
 Lilly Daché
 Olga Bertram Erteszek
 Bette Clair McMurray Nesmith Graham
 Florence Greenberg
 Florence Griffith Joyner
 Marjorie Stewart Joyner
 Effa Manley
 Sylvia Porter
 Josephine Roche
 Mary G. Roebling
 Anna Marie Lederer (Hoffman) Rosenberg
 Dorothy Schiff
 Victoria Regina Spivey
 Louise Thaden
 Brownie Wise

Chemistry 

 Hazel Gladys Bishop
 Katharine Burr Blodgett
 Rachel Fuller Brown
 Mary Peters Fieser
 Anna Jane Harrison
 Icie Gertrude Macy Hoobler
 Hazel Katherine Stiebeling

Child Advocacy/Education 

 Theodora Mead Abel
 Mary Dinsmore Salter Ainsworth
 Louise Bates Ames
 Jeanne Sternlicht Chall
 Mamie Phipps Clark
 Abigail Adams Eliot
 Martha May Eliot
 Selma Fraiberg
 Susan Walton Gray
 Helen Heffernan
 Carmelita Chase Hinton
 Icie Gertrude Macy Hoobler
 Edith Banfield Jackson
 Mary Cover Jones
 Marion Edwena Kenworthy
 Margaret Mahler
 Margaret Jeannette Naumburg
 Justine Wise Polier
 Zerna Addas Sharp
 Lois Hayden Meek Stolz

Children's Literature 

 Harriet Stratemeyer Adams
 Augusta Baker
 Elizabeth Jane Coatsworth
 Virginia Haviland
 Ursula Nordstrom
 Ann Petry
 Zerna Addas Sharp
 Yoshiko Uchida

Civil Rights 

 Frances Mary Albrier
 Sadie Tanner Mossell Alexander
 Anna Mae Aquash
 Ella Baker
 Daisy Lee Gatson Bates
 Sarah Patton Boyle
 Ruth Muskrat Bronson
 Lourdes Casal
 Mamie Phipps Clark
 Septima Poinsette Clark
 Lucy Friedlander Covington
 Barbara Deming
 Alice Allison Dunnigan
 Virginia Foster Durr
 Josefina Fierro
 Shirley Graham Du Bois
 Fannie Lou Hamer
 Grace Towns Hamilton
 Patricia Roberts Harris
 Anna Arnold Hedgeman
 María Latigo Hernández
 Ruby Hurley
 Estelle Ishigo
 Barbara Jordan
 Marjorie Stewart Joyner
 Margaret Eliza (Maggie) Kuhn
 Katharine Du Pre Lumpkin
 Luisa Moreno
 Anna Pauline (Pauli) Murray
 Graciela Olivarez
 Louise Alone Thompson Patterson
 Ethel L. Payne
 Mary Modjeska Monteith Simkins
 Hazel Brannon Smith
 Muriel Snowden
 Tish Sommers
 Mabel Doyle Keaton Staupers
 Johnnie Tillmon
 Fredi Washington
 Michi Nishiura Weglyn

El Congreso de Pueblos de Habla Española 

 Josefina Fierro
 Luisa Moreno

Mexican American Political Association 

 Francisca Flores

National Association for the Advancement of Colored People 

 Frances Mary Albrier
 Ella Baker
 Daisy Lee Gatson Bates
 Sarah Patton Boyle
 Septima Poinsette Clark
 Marion Vera Cuthbert
 Virginia Foster Durr
 Shirley Graham Du Bois
 Wilma Scott Heide
 Ruby Hurley
 Florence Luscomb
 Effa Manley
 Gloria Martin
 Anna Pauline (Pauli) Murray
 Rose Finkelstein Norwood
 Mary Modjeska Monteith Simkins
 Mabel Doyle Keaton Staupers
 Fredi Washington
 Myra Komaroff Wolfgang

Southern Christian Leadership Council 

 Ella Baker
 Septima Poinsette Clark

Southern Conference on Human Welfare 

 Virginia Foster Durr
 Mary Modjeska Monteith Simkins

Student Non-Violent Coordinating Committee 

 Ella Baker
 Fannie Lou Hamer

Community Activism/Local Government 

 Frances Mary Albrier
 Sadie Tanner Mosell Alexander
 Anna Mae Aquash
 Ella Baker
 Toni Cade Bambara
 Pilar Barbosa de Rosario
 Leona Baumgartner
 Ruth Muskrat Bronson
 Letitia Woods Brown
 Lourdes Casal
 Aurora Castillo
 Dorothy Buffum Chandler
 Septima Poinsette Clark
 Lucy Friedlander Covington
 Josefina Fierro
 Francisca Flores
 Marsha Gomez
 Fannie Lou Hamer
 Grace Towns Hamilton
 Anna Arnold Hedgeman
 María Latigo Hernández
 Aki Kurose
 Myrtle Terry Lawrence
 Jane Kwong Lee
 Mollie Hong Min
 Maria Clemencia Colón Sánchez
 Mary Modjeska Monteith Simkins
 Muriel Snowden
 Tish Sommers
 Edith Rosenwald Stern
 Johnnie Tillmon
 Kazue Togasaki
 Elizabeth Wood

Computer Science 
See Mathematics

Conservation/Environmentalism 

 Connie Boucher
 Aurora Castillo
 Marjory Stoneman Douglas
 Helen Knothe Nearing
 Katharine Ordway
 Margaret Wentworth Owings
 Dixy Lee Ray
 Kim Williams

Conservatism 

 Dorothy Fosdick
 Irene Corbally Kuhn
 Suzanne La Follette
 Ayn Rand
 Dixy Lee Ray

Consumer Affairs 

 Betty Furness
 Esther Peterson
 Margaret Gilpin Reid
 Caroline Farrar Ware
 Aryness Joy Wickens

Crafts/Decorative Arts 

 Anni Albers
 Elsie Allen
 Ray Eames
 Lucy Martin Lewis
 Maria Montoya Martinez
 Essie Parrish
 Polingaysi Qoyawayma

Dance 

 Lucia Chase
 Alexandra Danilova
 Agnes De Mille
 Ragini Devi
 Angna Enters
 Martha Graham
 Margaret Newell H'Doubler
 Martha Hill
 Thelma Hill
 Hanya Holm
 Nora Kaye
 La Meri
 Carmelita Maracci
 Ruth Marian Page
 Pearl Primus
 Ginger Rogers
 Esther Rolle
 Bessie Schönberg
 Molly Spotted Elk
 Te Ata

Economics 

 Barbara Nachtrieb Armstrong
 Alice Bourneuf
 Eveline M. Burns
 Eleanor Lansing Dulles
 Mary Dublin Keyserling
 Elizabeth Morrissy
 Margaret Gilpin Reid
 Phyllis Ann Wallace
 Aryness Joy Wickens

Education: General 

 Amelia Agostini de del Río[1]
 María Teresa Babín
 Pilar Barbosa de Rosario
 Thea Bowman
 Ruth Muskrat Bronson
 Letitia Woods Brown
 Marjorie Lee Browne
 Mary (Polly) Ingraham Bunting
 Jeanne Sternlicht Chall
 Kathryn (Kay) Frederick Clarenbach
 Septima Poinsette Clark
 Alice Hanson Cook
 Marion Vera Cuthbert
 Eva Beatrice Dykes
 Abigail Adams Eliot
 Susan Walton Gray
 Edith Green
 Helen Heffernan
 Wilma Scott Heide
 Carmelita Chase Hinton
 Mildred McAfee Horton
 Lois Mailou Jones
 Flemmie Pansy Kittrell
 Elizabeth Duncan Koontz
 Aki Kurose
 Dorothy Maynor
 Christa McAuliffe
 Katharine McBride
 Bertha Clay McNeill
 Elizabeth Morrissy
 Margaret Jeannette Naumburg
 Polingaysi Qoyawayma
 Mina S. Rees
 Myra Pollack Sadker
 Zerna Addis Sharp
 Hilda Worthington Smith
 Lois Hayden Meek Stolz
 Trude Weiss-Rosmarin
 Barbara Mayer Wertheimer

Engineering/Technology 

 Katharine Burr Blodgett
 Beatrice Alice Hicks
 Judith Resnik

English/Literary Theory 

 María Teresa Babín
 Eva Beatrice Dykes
 Elaine Hedges
 Ellen Moers
 Margaret Walker

Fashion/Textile Design 

 Hazel Gladys Bishop
 Lilly Daché
 Louise Dahl-Wolfe
 Ray Eames
 Olga Bertram Erteszek
 Millicent Fenwick
 Edith Head
 Vera Maxwell
 Clare Potter
 Irene Sharaff
 Diana Vreeland
 Ruth Whitney

Feminism 

 Bella Abzug
 Donna Allen
 Toni Cade Bambara
 Jessie Shirley Bernard
 Doris E. Fleischman Bernays
 Ruth Harriet Bleier
 Mary (Polly) Ingraham Bunting
 Virginia (Toni) Carabillo
 Kathryn (Kay) Frederick Clarenbach
 Alice Hanson Cook
 Catherine East
 India Edwards
 Eleanor Flexner
 Francisca Flores
 Marsha Gomez
 Edith Green
 Elaine Hedges
 Wilma Scott Heide
 Margaret Ann Hickey
 Lucy Somerville Howorth
 Joan Kelly
 Mary Dublin Keyserling
 Elizabeth Duncan Koontz
 Margaret Eliza (Maggie) Kuhn
 Suzanne La Follette
 Eleanor Leacock
 Audre Lorde
 Florence Luscomb
 Olga Marie Madar
 Gloria Martin
 Burnita Shelton Matthews
 Ana Mendieta
 Ellen Moers
 Nelle Katharine Morton
 Anna Pauline (Pauli) Murray
 Alice Paul
 Esther Peterson
 Harriet Fleischl Pilpel
 Marguerite Rawalt
 Esther Rome
 Myra Pollack Sadker
 Clara Lemlich Shavelson
 Valerie Solanas
 Tish Sommers
 Johnnie Tillmon
 Sister Annette (Margaret Anna) Walters
 Barbara Mayer Wertheimer
 Myra Komaroff Wolfgang

Film 

 Eve Arden
 Dorothy Arzner
 Pearl Bailey
 Lucille Ball
 Louise Brooks
 Mary Ellen Bute
 Theresa Hak Kyung Cha
 Shirley Clarke
 Joan Crawford
 Bette Davis
 Dolores Del Río
 Colleen Dewhurst
 Marlene Dietrich
 Ray Eames
 Greta Garbo
 Lillian Gish
 Frances Goodrich
 Ruth Gordon
 Rita Hayworth
 Edith Head
 Nora Kaye
 Anita Loos
 Ida Lupino
 Mary Martin
 Barbara McLean
 Thelma (Butterfly) McQueen
 Ruth Orkin
 Mary Pickford
 Molly Picon
 Ginger Rogers
 Esther Rolle
 Irene Sharaff
 Molly Spotted Elk
 Barbara Stanwyck
 Adela Rogers St. Johns
 Jessica Tandy
 Fredi Washington
 Ethel Waters
 Mae West

Food 

 Joyce Chen
 Grace Zia Chu
 M.F.K. (Mary Frances Kennedy) Fisher

Gardening 

 Katharine White

Government: Appointed Officials (State and Federal) 

 Daisy Lee Gatson Bates
 Leona Baumgartner
 Clara Mortenson Beyer
 Rose Elizabeth Bird
 Alice Bourneuf
 Ruth Muskrat Bronson
 Eveline M. Burns
 Georgia Neese Clark
 Jacqueline Cochran
 Ruth Baldwin Cowan
 Eleanor Lansing Dulles
 Catherine East
 Martha May Eliot
 Millicent Fenwick
 Dorothy Fosdick
 Betty Furness
 Martha Gellhorn
 Joy Bright Hancock
 Pamela Harriman
 Patricia Roberts Harris
 Anna Arnold Hedgeman
 Helen Heffernan
 Margaret Ann Hickey
 Oveta Culp Hobby
 Mildred McAfee Horton
 Lucy Somerville Howorth
 Mary Dublin Keyserling
 Elizabeth Duncan Koontz
 Lucile Petry Leone
 Clare Boothe Luce
 Marion Ella Martin
 Graciela Olivarez
 Esther Peterson
 Marguerite Rawalt
 Dixy Lee Ray
 Mina S. Rees
 Margaret Gilpin Reid
 Josephine Roche
 Anna Marie Lederer Rosenberg
 Nellie Tayloe Ross
 Edith Spurlock Sampson
 Gay Bolling Shepperson
 Hilda Worthington Smith
 Mary Louise Smith
 Hazel Katherine Stiebeling
 Lois Hayden Meek Stolz
 Anna Lord Strauss
 Ruth Cheney Streeter
 Louise Thaden
 Marietta Tree
 Ruth Murray Underhill
 Phyllis Ann Wallace
 Caroline Farrar Ware
 Katharine Way
 Aryness Joy Wickens
 Ellen Black Winston
 Elizabeth Wood

History 

 Amelia Agostini de del Río
 Pilar Barbosa de Rosario
 Margarete Bieber
 Ruth Harriet Bleier
 Fawn McKay Brodie
 Letitia Woods Brown
 Lucy S. Dawidowicz
 Angie Elbertha Debo
 Eleanor Flexner
 Joan Kelly
 Mary Pukui
 Barbara Wertheim Tuchman
 Caroline Farrar Ware
 Barbara Mayer Wertheimer
 Dorothy Porter Wesley

Home Economics 
See Nutrition

Housing Reform 

 Elisabeth Coit
 Helen Hall
 Elizabeth Wood
 International Affairs
 Clara Mortenson Beyer
 Frances Payne Bingham Bolton
 Alice Bourneuf
 Eleanor Lansing Dulles
 Dorothy Fosdick
 Pauline Frederick
 Pamela Harriman
 Patricia Roberts Harris
 Esther Lape
 Kathleen (Katie) Louchheim
 Clare Boothe Luce
 Edith Spurlock Sampson
 Anna Lord Strauss
 Marietta Tree
 Caroline Farrar Ware

Journalism 

 Donna Allen
 Djuna Barnes
 Daisy Lee Gatson Bates
 Doris E. Fleischman Bernays
 Mary Clifford Caperton Bingham
 Erma Bombeck
 Emma Bugbee
 Dorothy Buffum Chandler
 Ruth Baldwin Cowan
 Charlotte Murray Curtis
 Dorothy May Day
 Peggy Dennis
 Nancy Dickerson
 Alice Allison Dunnigan
 India Edwards
 Margaret Farrar
 Janet Flanner
 Francisca Flores
 Pauline Frederick
 Betty Furness
 Hazel Garland
 Martha Gellhorn
 Mary Ellen (Meg) Greenfield
 Margaret Ann Hickey
 Oveta Culp Hobby
 Freda Kirchwey
 Irene Corbally Kuhn
 Rose Kushner
 Suzanne La Follette
 Louise Leung Larson
 Jane Kwong Lee
 Mary Margaret McBride
 Jessie Lloyd O'Connor
 Ruth Orkin
 Ethel L. Payne
 Sylvia Porter
 Ruth Ross
 Martha Rountree
 Julia Evelyn Ruuttila
 Dorothy Schiff
 Sigrid Lillian Schultz
 Hazel Brannon Smith
 Adela Rogers St. Johns
 Trude Weiss-Rosmarin
 Dorothy West
 Ruth Whitney
 Nancy Woodhull

Labor 

 Frances Mary Albrier
 Donna Allen
 Clara Mortenson Beyer
 Alice Hanson Cook
 Helen Lake Kanahele
 Myrtle Terry Lawrence
 Sue Ko Lee
 Olga Marie Madar
 Jennie Matyas
 Luisa Moreno
 Pauline Newman
 Rose Finkelstein Norwood
 Esther Peterson
 Josephine Roche
 Anna Marie Lederer Rosenberg
 Julia Evelyn Ruuttila
 Clara Lemlich Shavelson
 Hilda Worthington Smith
 Emma Tenayuca
 Vera Buch Weisbord
 Barbara Mayer Wertheimer
 Myra Komaroff Wolfgang
 Elaine Black Yoneda

Law and Judiciary 

 Bella Abzug
 Sadie Tanner Mossell Alexander
 Barbara Nachtrieb Armstrong
 Rose Elizabeth Bird
 Patricia Roberts Harris
 Margaret Ann Hickey
 Lucy Somerville Howorth
 Barbara Jordan
 Burnita Shelton Matthews
 Soia Mentschikoff
 Anna Pauline (Pauli) Murray
 Graciela Olivarez
 Alice Paul
 Harriet Fleischl Pilpel
 Justine Wise Polier
 Marguerite Rawalt
 Edith Spurlock Sampson

Librarians/Archivists 

 Augusta Baker
 Margaret Storrs Grierson
 Virginia Haviland
 Dorothy Porter Wesley

Mathematics/Statistics/Computer Science 

 Marjorie Lee Browne
 Grace Murray Hopper
 Mina S. Rees
 Julia B. Robinson
 Olga Taussky-Todd
 Aryness Joy Wickens
 Dorothy Maud Wrinch

Medicine: Physicians and Health Care Activists 

 Barbara Nachtrieb Armstrong
 Ruth Harriet Bleier
 Hilde Bruch
 Mary Steichen Calderone
 May Edward Chinn
 Mamie Phipps Clark
 Martha May Eliot
 Dorothy Boulding Ferebee
 Harriet Louise Hardy
 Edith Banfield Jackson
 Esther Lape
 Mary Woodard Reinhardt Lasker
 Onnie Lee Rodgers Logan
 Helen Brooke Taussig
 Kazue Togasaki
 Annie Dodge Wauneka

Military 

 Jacqueline Cochran
 Joy Bright Hancock
 Oveta Culp Hobby
 Grace Murray Hopper
 Mildred McAfee Horton
 Lucile Petry Leone
 Nancy Harkness Love
 Ruth Cheney Streeter

Museums/Curators 

 Agnes Mongan
 Marjorie Acker Phillips
 Tatiana Proskouriakoff
 Diana Vreeland
 Hannah Marie Wormington

Music: Classical 

 Marian Anderson
 Antonia Louisa Brico
 Maria Callas
 Jan DeGaetani
 Miriam Gideon
 Shirley Graham Du Bois
 Margaret Hillis
 Lotte Lenya
 Dorothy Maynor
 Rosa Ponselle
 Catherine Filene Shouse
 Louise Talma
 Elinor Remick Warren

Music: Popular 

 Pearl Bailey
 Maybelle Addington Carter
 Elizabeth (Libba) Cotten
 Ella Fitzgerald
 Florence Greenberg
 Alberta Hunter
 Sylvia Fine Kaye
 Melba Liston
 Ethel Merman
 Laura Nyro
 Minnie Pearl
 Selena
 Dinah Shore
 Kate Smith
 Victoria Regina Spivey
 Willie Mae Thornton
 Sarah Vaughan
 Ethel Waters
 Mary Lou Williams
 Tammy Wynette

Nursing 

 Frances Payne Bingham Bolton
 Wilma Scott Heide
 Lucile Petry Leone
 Estelle Massey Riddle Osborne
 Hildegard E. Peplau
 Mabel Doyle Keaton Staupers

Nutrition/Home Economics 

 Icie Gertrude Macy Hoobler
 Flemmie Pansy Kittrell
 Margaret Gilpin Reid
 Hazel Katherine Stiebeling

Peace 

 Bella Abzug
 Donna Allen
 Dorothy May Day
 Barbara Deming
 Dorothy Detzer
 Fay Honey Knopp
 Aki Kurose
 Esther Lape
 Florence Luscomb
 Bertha Clay McNeill
 Mildred Scott Olmsted
 Mildred Norman (Peace Pilgrim) Ryder

Penology and Criminology 

 Fay Honey Knopp

Philanthropy 

 Mary Clifford Caperton Bingham
 Frances Payne Bingham Bolton
 Dorothy Buffum Chandler
 Dominique De Menil
 Bette Clair McMurray Nesmith Graham
 Pamela Harriman
 Mary Woodard Reinhardt Lasker
 Katharine Ordway
 Marjorie Acker Phillips
 Catherine Filene Shouse
 Edith Rosenwald Stern
 Lila Bell Acheson Wallace

Philosophy 

 Susanne K. Langer
 Helen Merrell Lynd
 Ayn Rand

Photography 

 Berenice Abbott
 Imogen Cunningham
 Louise Dahl-Wolfe
 Laura Gilpin
 Ruth Orkin
 Marion Post Wolcott

Physics 

 Katharine Burr Blodgett
 Gertrude Scharff Goldhaber
 Leona Woods Marshall Libby
 Edith Hinkley Quimby
 Katharine Way
 Chien-Shiung Wu

Political Science 

 Pilar Barbosa de Rosario
 Kathryn (Kay) Frederick Clarenbach

Politics: Elected Officials/Activists/Volunteers 

 Bella Abzug
 Frances Payne Bingham Bolton
 Helen Gahagan Douglas
 India Edwards
 Millicent Fenwick
 Dorothy Fosdick
 Ella Tambussi Grasso
 Edith Green
 Fannie Lou Hamer
 Grace Towns Hamilton
 Lucy Somerville Howorth
 Barbara Jordan
 Coya Gjesdal Knutson
 Alice Roosevelt Longworth
 Kathleen (Katie) Louchheim
 Clare Boothe Luce
 Marion Ella Martin
 Jacqueline Lee Bouvier Kennedy Onassis
 Dixy Lee Ray
 Felisa Rincón de Gautier
 Nellie Tayloe Ross
 Maria Clemencia Colón Sánchez
 Catherine Filene Shouse
 Margaret Chase Smith
 Mary Louise Smith
 Marietta Tree

Psychiatry/Psychoanalysis/Psychiatric Social Work 

 Therese F. Benedek
 Hilde Bruch
 Helene Deutsch
 Selma Fraiberg
 Phyllis Greenacre
 Edith Banfield Jackson
 Marion Edwena Kenworthy
 Margaret Mahler
 Hildegard E. Peplau
 Bertha Capen Reynolds

Psychology 

 Theodora Mead Abel
 Mary Dinsmore Salter Ainsworth
 Louise Bates Ames
 Jeanne Sternlicht Chall
 Mamie Phipps Clark
 Susan Walton Gray
 Evelyn Hooker
 Mary Cover Jones
 Katharine McBride
 Emily Hartshorne Mudd
 Margaret Jeannette Naumburg
 Carolyn Wood Sherif
 Lois Hayden Meek Stolz
 Sister Annette Walters
 Cynthia Clark Wedel

Public Health/Women's Health 

 Leona Baumgartner
 Mary Steichen Calderone
 Dorothy Boulding Ferebee
 Harriet Louise Hardy
 Rose Kushner
 Onnie Lee Rodgers Logan
 Emily Hartshorne Mudd
 Esther Rome
 Annie Dodge Wauneka

Publishing/Editing 

 Harriet Stratemeyer Adams
 Virginia (Toni) Carabillo
 Amy Clampitt
 Margaret Farrar
 Martha Foley
 Freda Kirchwey
 Suzanne La Follette
 Ursula Nordstrom
 Jacqueline Lee Bouvier Kennedy Onassis
 Ruth Ross
 Diana Vreeland
 Lila Bell Acheson Wallace
 Trude Weiss-Rosmarin
 Katharine White
 Ruth Whitney
 Helen Wolff
 Nancy Woodhull

Radicalism/Socialism 

 Dorothy May Day
 Angie Elbertha Debo
 Barbara Deming
 Peggy Dennis
 Josefina Fierro
 Eleanor Flexner
 Margaret Eliza (Maggie) Kuhn
 Meridel Le Sueur
 Katharine Du Pre Lumpkin
 Florence Luscomb
 Gloria Martin
 Jessica Mitford
 Jessie Lloyd O'Connor
 Louise Alone Thompson Patterson
 Bertha Capen Reynolds
 Muriel Rukeyser
 Julia Evelyn Ruuttila
 Clara Lemlich Shavelson
 Valerie Solanas
 Emma Tenayuca
 Vera Buch Weisbord
 Elaine Black Yoneda

Radio/Television 

 Eve Arden
 Lucille Ball
 Erma Bombeck
 Colleen Dewhurst
 Nancy Dickerson
 Pauline Frederick
 Betty Furness
 Anne Hummert
 Lucille Kallen
 Sylvia Fine Kaye
 Mary Livingstone
 Ida Lupino
 Mary Martin
 Mary Margaret McBride
 Thelma (Butterfly) McQueen
 Ethel L. Payne
 Minnie Pearl
 Gilda Radner
 Ginger Rogers
 Esther Rolle
 Martha Rountree
 Dinah Shore
 Kate Smith
 Barbara Stanwyck
 Kim Williams

Religion/Spirituality 

 Thea Bowman
 Dorothy May Day
 Corita Kent
 Kathryn Johanna Kuhlman
 Catherine Marshall
 Elizabeth Morrissy
 Nelle Katharine Morton
 Anna Pauline (Pauli) Murray
 Madalyn Murray O'Hair
 Essie Parrish
 Jeannette Ridlon Piccard
 Mildred Norman (Peace Pilgrim) Ryder
 Sister Annette Walters
 Cynthia Clark Wedel
 Trude Weiss-Rosmarin

Social Work 

 Helen Hall
 Marion Edwena Kenworthy
 Jane Kwong Lee
 Mildred Scott Olmsted
 Bertha Capen Reynolds
 Josephine Roche
 Gay Bolling Shepperson

Socialite/Hostess 

 Pamela Harriman
 Alice Roosevelt Longworth
 Marietta Tree

Sociology 

 Jessie Shirley Bernard
 Mirra Komarovsky
 Helen Merrell Lynd
 Ellen Black Winston

Sports/Physical Education/Recreation 

 Dorothy Sears Ainsworth[2]
 Florence May Chadwick
 Glenna Collett
 Alice Greenough
 Florence Griffith Joyner
 Margaret Newell H'Doubler
 Effa Manley
 Helen Wills Moody
 Wilma Rudolph
 Miriam O'Brien Underhill
 Margaret Wade

Theater/Vaudeville/Comedy 

 Kathy Acker
 Stella Adler
 Eve Arden
 Pearl Bailey
 Alice Childress
 Cheryl Crawford
 Agnes De Mille
 Colleen Dewhurst
 Helen Gahagan Douglas
 Angna Enters
 Lynn Fontanne
 Frances Goodrich
 Ruth Gordon
 Helen Hayes
 Lillian Hellman
 Sylvia Fine Kaye
 Eva Le Gallienne
 Lotte Lenya
 Anita Loos
 Clare Boothe Luce
 Mary Martin
 Ethel Merman
 Josefina Niggli
 Molly Picon
 Gilda Radner
 Ginger Rogers
 Esther Rolle
 Irene Sharaff
 Molly Spotted Elk
 Jessica Tandy
 Te Ata
 Estela Portillo Trambley
 Fredi Washington
 Ethel Waters
 Mae West

Women's Health. See Public Health

Women's Organizations

American Association of University Women 

 Eveline M. Burns
 Dorothy Boulding Ferebee
 Lois Hayden Meek Stolz
 Caroline Farrar Ware

Coalition of Labor Union Women 

 Olga Marie Madar
 Barbara Mayer Wertheimer
 Myra Komaroff Wolfgang

League of Women Voters 

 Kathryn (Kay) Frederick Clarenbach
 Ella Tambussi Grasso
 Edith Green
 Wilma Scott Heide
 Oveta Culp Hobby
 Esther Lape
 Anna Lord Strauss
 Ruth Cheney Streeter
 Caroline Farrar Ware

National Consumers' League 

 Clara Mortenson Beyer
 Eveline M. Burns
 Mary Dublin Keyserling
 Josephine Roche

National Council of Negro Women 

 Frances Mary Albrier
 Dorothy Boulding Ferebee
 Marjorie Stewart Joyner
 Thelma (Butterfly) McQueen
 Edith Spurlock Sampson

National Federation of Business and Professional Women 

 Edith Green
 Margaret Ann Hickey
 Margaret Chase Smith

National Organization for Women 

 Donna Allen
 Virginia (Toni) Carabillo
 Kathryn (Kay) Frederick Clarenbach
 Catherine East
 Wilma Scott Heide
 Anna Pauline (Pauli) Murray
 Marguerite Rawalt
 Tish Sommers
 Barbara Mayer Wertheimer

National Woman's Party 

 Burnita Shelton Matthews
 Alice Paul
 Marguerite Rawalt

National Women's Political Caucus 

 Bella Abzug
 Donna Allen
 Kathryn (Kay) Frederick Clarenbach
 Olga Marie Madar

Planned Parenthood Federation of America 

 Mary Steichen Calderone
 Estelle Trebert Griswold
 Mary Woodard Reinhardt Lasker
 Harriet Fleischl Pilpel
 Mary Louise Smith
 Women's Equity Action League
 Jessie Shirley Bernard
 Olga Marie Madar
 Marguerite Rawalt

Women's International League for Peace and Freedom 

 Donna Allen
 Dorothy Detzer
 Freda Kirchwey
 Florence Luscomb
 Bertha Clay McNeill
 Jessie Lloyd O'Connor
 Mildred Scott Olmsted

Women Strike for Peace 

 Bella Abzug
 Donna Allen
 Fay Honey Knopp

Women's Trade Union League 

 Pauline Newman
 Rose Finkelstein Norwood

Young Women's Christian Association 

 Ella Baker
 Ruth Muskrat Bronson
 Alice Hanson Cook
 Marion Vera Cuthbert
 Dorothy Boulding Ferebee
 Hazel Garland
 Helen Hall
 Grace Towns Hamilton
 Patricia Roberts Harris
 Anna Arnold Hedgeman
 Margaret Ann Hickey
 Lucy Somerville Howorth
 Ruby Hurley
 Margaret Eliza (Maggie) Kuhn
 Jane Kwong Lee
 Katharine Du Pre Lumpkin
 Mollie Hong Min
 Esther Peterson
 Lila Bell Acheson Wallace

Other 

 Marion Vera Cuthbert
 Dorothy Boulding Ferebee
 Anna Arnold Hedgeman
 Caroline Farrar Ware
 Cynthia Clark Wedel

Writers/Poets 

 Kathy Acker
 Amelia Agostini de del Río
 Harriette Simpson Arnow
 Toni Cade Bambara
 Djuna Barnes
 Gwendolyn Bennett
 Elizabeth Bishop
 Erma Bombeck
 Kay Boyle
 Sarah Patton Boyle
 Fawn McKay Brodie
 Louise Brooks
 Lydia Cabrera
 Lourdes Casal
 Theresa Hak Kyung Cha
 Alice Childress
 Amy Clampitt
 Elizabeth Jane Coatsworth
 Lucy S. Dawidowicz
 Barbara Deming
 Marjory Stoneman Douglas
 M.F.K. Fisher / Mary Frances Kennedy Fisher
 Janet Flanner
 Martha Gellhorn
 Shirley Graham Du Bois
 Lillian Hellman
 Jane Kenyon
 Meridel Le Sueur
 Denise Levertov
 Onnie Lee Rodgers Logan
 Anita Loos
 Audre Lorde
 Katharine Du Pre Lumpkin
 Catherine Marshall
 Mary McCarthy
 Jessica Mitford
 Anna Pauline (Pauli) Murray
 Helen Knothe Nearing
 Josefina Niggli
 Anaïs Nin
 Ann Petry
 Katherine Anne Porter
 Polingaysi Qoyawayma
 Ayn Rand
 Muriel Rukeyser
 May Sarton
 Helen Sekaquaptewa
 Jean Stafford
 May Swenson
 Mary TallMountain
 Teiko Tomita
 Estela Portillo Trambley
 Diana Rubin Trilling
 Barbara Wertheim Tuchman
 Yoshiko Uchida
 Margaret Walker
 Michi Nishiura Weglyn
 Dorothy West
 Kim Williams

Zoology 

 Dian Fossey
 Jane Marion Oppenheimer

Bibliography 
 Notable American Women: a biographical dictionary completing the twentieth century. (2004). Ware, Susan (editor), Stacy Braukman, assistant editor. Belknap Press of Harvard University Press: Cambridge, Mass. .

References

United States biographical dictionaries
History of women in the United States
Women in North America
Biographical dictionaries of women
Lists of American women